

50001–50100 

|-bgcolor=#fefefe
| 50001 ||  || — || January 3, 2000 || Socorro || LINEAR || — || align=right | 2.1 km || 
|-id=002 bgcolor=#fefefe
| 50002 ||  || — || January 3, 2000 || Socorro || LINEAR || — || align=right | 2.9 km || 
|-id=003 bgcolor=#fefefe
| 50003 ||  || — || January 3, 2000 || Socorro || LINEAR || V || align=right | 2.4 km || 
|-id=004 bgcolor=#fefefe
| 50004 ||  || — || January 3, 2000 || Socorro || LINEAR || NYS || align=right | 3.8 km || 
|-id=005 bgcolor=#fefefe
| 50005 ||  || — || January 3, 2000 || Socorro || LINEAR || — || align=right | 4.5 km || 
|-id=006 bgcolor=#fefefe
| 50006 ||  || — || January 3, 2000 || Socorro || LINEAR || — || align=right | 2.9 km || 
|-id=007 bgcolor=#fefefe
| 50007 ||  || — || January 3, 2000 || Socorro || LINEAR || FLO || align=right | 1.9 km || 
|-id=008 bgcolor=#fefefe
| 50008 ||  || — || January 3, 2000 || Socorro || LINEAR || MAS || align=right | 2.9 km || 
|-id=009 bgcolor=#fefefe
| 50009 ||  || — || January 3, 2000 || Socorro || LINEAR || — || align=right | 2.2 km || 
|-id=010 bgcolor=#E9E9E9
| 50010 ||  || — || January 3, 2000 || Socorro || LINEAR || — || align=right | 4.0 km || 
|-id=011 bgcolor=#fefefe
| 50011 ||  || — || January 3, 2000 || Socorro || LINEAR || — || align=right | 2.6 km || 
|-id=012 bgcolor=#fefefe
| 50012 ||  || — || January 3, 2000 || Socorro || LINEAR || FLO || align=right | 1.9 km || 
|-id=013 bgcolor=#fefefe
| 50013 ||  || — || January 3, 2000 || Socorro || LINEAR || NYS || align=right | 2.3 km || 
|-id=014 bgcolor=#fefefe
| 50014 ||  || — || January 3, 2000 || Socorro || LINEAR || — || align=right | 2.4 km || 
|-id=015 bgcolor=#fefefe
| 50015 ||  || — || January 3, 2000 || Socorro || LINEAR || V || align=right | 2.8 km || 
|-id=016 bgcolor=#fefefe
| 50016 ||  || — || January 3, 2000 || Socorro || LINEAR || — || align=right | 2.1 km || 
|-id=017 bgcolor=#fefefe
| 50017 ||  || — || January 3, 2000 || Socorro || LINEAR || — || align=right | 2.2 km || 
|-id=018 bgcolor=#fefefe
| 50018 ||  || — || January 3, 2000 || Socorro || LINEAR || V || align=right | 2.1 km || 
|-id=019 bgcolor=#E9E9E9
| 50019 ||  || — || January 3, 2000 || Socorro || LINEAR || — || align=right | 3.3 km || 
|-id=020 bgcolor=#fefefe
| 50020 ||  || — || January 3, 2000 || Socorro || LINEAR || FLO || align=right | 2.6 km || 
|-id=021 bgcolor=#fefefe
| 50021 ||  || — || January 3, 2000 || Socorro || LINEAR || — || align=right | 1.8 km || 
|-id=022 bgcolor=#E9E9E9
| 50022 ||  || — || January 3, 2000 || Socorro || LINEAR || — || align=right | 3.8 km || 
|-id=023 bgcolor=#fefefe
| 50023 ||  || — || January 3, 2000 || Socorro || LINEAR || — || align=right | 5.4 km || 
|-id=024 bgcolor=#fefefe
| 50024 ||  || — || January 3, 2000 || Socorro || LINEAR || — || align=right | 6.4 km || 
|-id=025 bgcolor=#fefefe
| 50025 ||  || — || January 3, 2000 || Socorro || LINEAR || V || align=right | 1.9 km || 
|-id=026 bgcolor=#fefefe
| 50026 ||  || — || January 3, 2000 || Socorro || LINEAR || FLO || align=right | 1.9 km || 
|-id=027 bgcolor=#fefefe
| 50027 ||  || — || January 2, 2000 || Kitt Peak || Spacewatch || — || align=right | 2.1 km || 
|-id=028 bgcolor=#E9E9E9
| 50028 ||  || — || January 5, 2000 || Kitt Peak || Spacewatch || MIS || align=right | 3.8 km || 
|-id=029 bgcolor=#fefefe
| 50029 ||  || — || January 4, 2000 || Socorro || LINEAR || MAS || align=right | 1.7 km || 
|-id=030 bgcolor=#E9E9E9
| 50030 ||  || — || January 4, 2000 || Socorro || LINEAR || GEF || align=right | 2.9 km || 
|-id=031 bgcolor=#E9E9E9
| 50031 ||  || — || January 4, 2000 || Socorro || LINEAR || — || align=right | 3.1 km || 
|-id=032 bgcolor=#fefefe
| 50032 ||  || — || January 4, 2000 || Socorro || LINEAR || V || align=right | 1.7 km || 
|-id=033 bgcolor=#E9E9E9
| 50033 Perelman ||  ||  || January 3, 2000 || Gnosca || S. Sposetti || — || align=right | 6.0 km || 
|-id=034 bgcolor=#E9E9E9
| 50034 ||  || — || January 6, 2000 || Prescott || P. G. Comba || — || align=right | 2.8 km || 
|-id=035 bgcolor=#fefefe
| 50035 ||  || — || January 6, 2000 || Višnjan Observatory || K. Korlević || — || align=right | 1.8 km || 
|-id=036 bgcolor=#fefefe
| 50036 ||  || — || January 4, 2000 || Socorro || LINEAR || — || align=right | 2.3 km || 
|-id=037 bgcolor=#fefefe
| 50037 ||  || — || January 4, 2000 || Socorro || LINEAR || — || align=right | 2.4 km || 
|-id=038 bgcolor=#E9E9E9
| 50038 ||  || — || January 4, 2000 || Socorro || LINEAR || — || align=right | 8.5 km || 
|-id=039 bgcolor=#fefefe
| 50039 ||  || — || January 4, 2000 || Socorro || LINEAR || — || align=right | 2.2 km || 
|-id=040 bgcolor=#fefefe
| 50040 ||  || — || January 4, 2000 || Socorro || LINEAR || NYS || align=right | 2.3 km || 
|-id=041 bgcolor=#E9E9E9
| 50041 ||  || — || January 4, 2000 || Socorro || LINEAR || — || align=right | 3.8 km || 
|-id=042 bgcolor=#E9E9E9
| 50042 ||  || — || January 4, 2000 || Socorro || LINEAR || EUN || align=right | 2.8 km || 
|-id=043 bgcolor=#fefefe
| 50043 ||  || — || January 4, 2000 || Socorro || LINEAR || — || align=right | 4.8 km || 
|-id=044 bgcolor=#fefefe
| 50044 ||  || — || January 4, 2000 || Socorro || LINEAR || — || align=right | 3.8 km || 
|-id=045 bgcolor=#fefefe
| 50045 ||  || — || January 4, 2000 || Socorro || LINEAR || — || align=right | 3.4 km || 
|-id=046 bgcolor=#fefefe
| 50046 ||  || — || January 4, 2000 || Socorro || LINEAR || — || align=right | 2.1 km || 
|-id=047 bgcolor=#E9E9E9
| 50047 ||  || — || January 4, 2000 || Socorro || LINEAR || — || align=right | 4.9 km || 
|-id=048 bgcolor=#fefefe
| 50048 ||  || — || January 4, 2000 || Socorro || LINEAR || V || align=right | 2.8 km || 
|-id=049 bgcolor=#fefefe
| 50049 ||  || — || January 4, 2000 || Socorro || LINEAR || V || align=right | 3.4 km || 
|-id=050 bgcolor=#E9E9E9
| 50050 ||  || — || January 4, 2000 || Socorro || LINEAR || — || align=right | 3.2 km || 
|-id=051 bgcolor=#fefefe
| 50051 ||  || — || January 4, 2000 || Socorro || LINEAR || NYS || align=right | 2.0 km || 
|-id=052 bgcolor=#fefefe
| 50052 ||  || — || January 4, 2000 || Socorro || LINEAR || — || align=right | 4.8 km || 
|-id=053 bgcolor=#E9E9E9
| 50053 ||  || — || January 4, 2000 || Socorro || LINEAR || — || align=right | 3.3 km || 
|-id=054 bgcolor=#E9E9E9
| 50054 ||  || — || January 4, 2000 || Socorro || LINEAR || — || align=right | 2.7 km || 
|-id=055 bgcolor=#E9E9E9
| 50055 ||  || — || January 4, 2000 || Socorro || LINEAR || — || align=right | 3.3 km || 
|-id=056 bgcolor=#E9E9E9
| 50056 ||  || — || January 4, 2000 || Socorro || LINEAR || MAR || align=right | 4.6 km || 
|-id=057 bgcolor=#E9E9E9
| 50057 ||  || — || January 4, 2000 || Socorro || LINEAR || — || align=right | 9.0 km || 
|-id=058 bgcolor=#fefefe
| 50058 ||  || — || January 4, 2000 || Socorro || LINEAR || NYS || align=right | 1.8 km || 
|-id=059 bgcolor=#E9E9E9
| 50059 ||  || — || January 4, 2000 || Socorro || LINEAR || — || align=right | 5.3 km || 
|-id=060 bgcolor=#fefefe
| 50060 ||  || — || January 4, 2000 || Socorro || LINEAR || FLO || align=right | 2.8 km || 
|-id=061 bgcolor=#fefefe
| 50061 ||  || — || January 5, 2000 || Socorro || LINEAR || FLO || align=right | 1.7 km || 
|-id=062 bgcolor=#fefefe
| 50062 ||  || — || January 5, 2000 || Socorro || LINEAR || NYS || align=right | 1.5 km || 
|-id=063 bgcolor=#fefefe
| 50063 ||  || — || January 5, 2000 || Socorro || LINEAR || — || align=right | 2.7 km || 
|-id=064 bgcolor=#fefefe
| 50064 ||  || — || January 5, 2000 || Socorro || LINEAR || V || align=right | 2.3 km || 
|-id=065 bgcolor=#fefefe
| 50065 ||  || — || January 5, 2000 || Socorro || LINEAR || ERI || align=right | 6.3 km || 
|-id=066 bgcolor=#fefefe
| 50066 ||  || — || January 5, 2000 || Socorro || LINEAR || FLO || align=right | 1.9 km || 
|-id=067 bgcolor=#fefefe
| 50067 ||  || — || January 5, 2000 || Socorro || LINEAR || NYS || align=right | 1.5 km || 
|-id=068 bgcolor=#fefefe
| 50068 ||  || — || January 5, 2000 || Socorro || LINEAR || ERI || align=right | 5.2 km || 
|-id=069 bgcolor=#fefefe
| 50069 ||  || — || January 5, 2000 || Socorro || LINEAR || V || align=right | 2.0 km || 
|-id=070 bgcolor=#fefefe
| 50070 ||  || — || January 5, 2000 || Socorro || LINEAR || V || align=right | 1.8 km || 
|-id=071 bgcolor=#fefefe
| 50071 ||  || — || January 5, 2000 || Socorro || LINEAR || — || align=right | 2.0 km || 
|-id=072 bgcolor=#fefefe
| 50072 ||  || — || January 5, 2000 || Socorro || LINEAR || FLO || align=right | 2.7 km || 
|-id=073 bgcolor=#fefefe
| 50073 ||  || — || January 5, 2000 || Socorro || LINEAR || — || align=right | 2.0 km || 
|-id=074 bgcolor=#fefefe
| 50074 ||  || — || January 5, 2000 || Socorro || LINEAR || — || align=right | 1.9 km || 
|-id=075 bgcolor=#fefefe
| 50075 ||  || — || January 5, 2000 || Socorro || LINEAR || NYS || align=right | 2.0 km || 
|-id=076 bgcolor=#E9E9E9
| 50076 ||  || — || January 5, 2000 || Socorro || LINEAR || — || align=right | 2.1 km || 
|-id=077 bgcolor=#fefefe
| 50077 ||  || — || January 5, 2000 || Socorro || LINEAR || — || align=right | 1.9 km || 
|-id=078 bgcolor=#fefefe
| 50078 ||  || — || January 5, 2000 || Socorro || LINEAR || NYS || align=right | 1.8 km || 
|-id=079 bgcolor=#E9E9E9
| 50079 ||  || — || January 5, 2000 || Socorro || LINEAR || — || align=right | 4.6 km || 
|-id=080 bgcolor=#fefefe
| 50080 ||  || — || January 5, 2000 || Socorro || LINEAR || FLO || align=right | 2.1 km || 
|-id=081 bgcolor=#fefefe
| 50081 ||  || — || January 5, 2000 || Socorro || LINEAR || FLO || align=right | 2.3 km || 
|-id=082 bgcolor=#fefefe
| 50082 ||  || — || January 5, 2000 || Socorro || LINEAR || V || align=right | 2.2 km || 
|-id=083 bgcolor=#E9E9E9
| 50083 ||  || — || January 5, 2000 || Socorro || LINEAR || — || align=right | 2.7 km || 
|-id=084 bgcolor=#fefefe
| 50084 ||  || — || January 5, 2000 || Socorro || LINEAR || V || align=right | 2.0 km || 
|-id=085 bgcolor=#fefefe
| 50085 ||  || — || January 5, 2000 || Socorro || LINEAR || V || align=right | 2.2 km || 
|-id=086 bgcolor=#fefefe
| 50086 ||  || — || January 5, 2000 || Socorro || LINEAR || V || align=right | 2.3 km || 
|-id=087 bgcolor=#fefefe
| 50087 ||  || — || January 5, 2000 || Socorro || LINEAR || FLO || align=right | 2.1 km || 
|-id=088 bgcolor=#fefefe
| 50088 ||  || — || January 4, 2000 || Socorro || LINEAR || — || align=right | 1.7 km || 
|-id=089 bgcolor=#fefefe
| 50089 ||  || — || January 4, 2000 || Socorro || LINEAR || — || align=right | 2.7 km || 
|-id=090 bgcolor=#fefefe
| 50090 ||  || — || January 4, 2000 || Socorro || LINEAR || — || align=right | 2.9 km || 
|-id=091 bgcolor=#fefefe
| 50091 ||  || — || January 4, 2000 || Socorro || LINEAR || — || align=right | 2.5 km || 
|-id=092 bgcolor=#fefefe
| 50092 ||  || — || January 4, 2000 || Socorro || LINEAR || — || align=right | 2.7 km || 
|-id=093 bgcolor=#fefefe
| 50093 ||  || — || January 4, 2000 || Socorro || LINEAR || — || align=right | 2.1 km || 
|-id=094 bgcolor=#fefefe
| 50094 ||  || — || January 4, 2000 || Socorro || LINEAR || — || align=right | 2.9 km || 
|-id=095 bgcolor=#E9E9E9
| 50095 ||  || — || January 4, 2000 || Socorro || LINEAR || — || align=right | 2.9 km || 
|-id=096 bgcolor=#d6d6d6
| 50096 ||  || — || January 4, 2000 || Socorro || LINEAR || — || align=right | 4.5 km || 
|-id=097 bgcolor=#E9E9E9
| 50097 ||  || — || January 4, 2000 || Socorro || LINEAR || — || align=right | 4.2 km || 
|-id=098 bgcolor=#fefefe
| 50098 ||  || — || January 4, 2000 || Socorro || LINEAR || — || align=right | 4.2 km || 
|-id=099 bgcolor=#fefefe
| 50099 ||  || — || January 4, 2000 || Socorro || LINEAR || — || align=right | 3.4 km || 
|-id=100 bgcolor=#fefefe
| 50100 ||  || — || January 5, 2000 || Socorro || LINEAR || — || align=right | 1.9 km || 
|}

50101–50200 

|-bgcolor=#fefefe
| 50101 ||  || — || January 5, 2000 || Socorro || LINEAR || V || align=right | 1.6 km || 
|-id=102 bgcolor=#fefefe
| 50102 ||  || — || January 5, 2000 || Socorro || LINEAR || — || align=right | 2.2 km || 
|-id=103 bgcolor=#fefefe
| 50103 ||  || — || January 5, 2000 || Socorro || LINEAR || — || align=right | 2.6 km || 
|-id=104 bgcolor=#fefefe
| 50104 ||  || — || January 5, 2000 || Socorro || LINEAR || — || align=right | 2.1 km || 
|-id=105 bgcolor=#fefefe
| 50105 ||  || — || January 5, 2000 || Socorro || LINEAR || — || align=right | 3.4 km || 
|-id=106 bgcolor=#fefefe
| 50106 ||  || — || January 5, 2000 || Socorro || LINEAR || — || align=right | 1.8 km || 
|-id=107 bgcolor=#fefefe
| 50107 ||  || — || January 5, 2000 || Socorro || LINEAR || FLO || align=right | 1.9 km || 
|-id=108 bgcolor=#fefefe
| 50108 ||  || — || January 5, 2000 || Socorro || LINEAR || — || align=right | 2.3 km || 
|-id=109 bgcolor=#d6d6d6
| 50109 ||  || — || January 5, 2000 || Socorro || LINEAR || — || align=right | 11 km || 
|-id=110 bgcolor=#fefefe
| 50110 ||  || — || January 5, 2000 || Socorro || LINEAR || — || align=right | 4.3 km || 
|-id=111 bgcolor=#E9E9E9
| 50111 ||  || — || January 5, 2000 || Socorro || LINEAR || EUN || align=right | 3.9 km || 
|-id=112 bgcolor=#fefefe
| 50112 ||  || — || January 5, 2000 || Socorro || LINEAR || — || align=right | 4.5 km || 
|-id=113 bgcolor=#E9E9E9
| 50113 ||  || — || January 5, 2000 || Socorro || LINEAR || — || align=right | 3.5 km || 
|-id=114 bgcolor=#fefefe
| 50114 ||  || — || January 5, 2000 || Socorro || LINEAR || V || align=right | 2.5 km || 
|-id=115 bgcolor=#fefefe
| 50115 ||  || — || January 5, 2000 || Socorro || LINEAR || FLO || align=right | 1.6 km || 
|-id=116 bgcolor=#E9E9E9
| 50116 ||  || — || January 5, 2000 || Socorro || LINEAR || AGN || align=right | 3.6 km || 
|-id=117 bgcolor=#E9E9E9
| 50117 ||  || — || January 5, 2000 || Socorro || LINEAR || — || align=right | 3.7 km || 
|-id=118 bgcolor=#fefefe
| 50118 ||  || — || January 5, 2000 || Socorro || LINEAR || FLO || align=right | 1.6 km || 
|-id=119 bgcolor=#fefefe
| 50119 ||  || — || January 5, 2000 || Socorro || LINEAR || — || align=right | 2.3 km || 
|-id=120 bgcolor=#fefefe
| 50120 ||  || — || January 5, 2000 || Socorro || LINEAR || V || align=right | 1.9 km || 
|-id=121 bgcolor=#fefefe
| 50121 ||  || — || January 5, 2000 || Socorro || LINEAR || V || align=right | 1.8 km || 
|-id=122 bgcolor=#fefefe
| 50122 ||  || — || January 5, 2000 || Socorro || LINEAR || — || align=right | 2.5 km || 
|-id=123 bgcolor=#fefefe
| 50123 ||  || — || January 5, 2000 || Socorro || LINEAR || — || align=right | 1.8 km || 
|-id=124 bgcolor=#fefefe
| 50124 ||  || — || January 5, 2000 || Socorro || LINEAR || V || align=right | 2.3 km || 
|-id=125 bgcolor=#fefefe
| 50125 ||  || — || January 5, 2000 || Socorro || LINEAR || FLO || align=right | 1.5 km || 
|-id=126 bgcolor=#fefefe
| 50126 ||  || — || January 5, 2000 || Socorro || LINEAR || — || align=right | 2.1 km || 
|-id=127 bgcolor=#E9E9E9
| 50127 ||  || — || January 5, 2000 || Socorro || LINEAR || — || align=right | 3.3 km || 
|-id=128 bgcolor=#fefefe
| 50128 ||  || — || January 5, 2000 || Socorro || LINEAR || FLO || align=right | 1.8 km || 
|-id=129 bgcolor=#E9E9E9
| 50129 ||  || — || January 5, 2000 || Socorro || LINEAR || GEF || align=right | 3.1 km || 
|-id=130 bgcolor=#fefefe
| 50130 ||  || — || January 5, 2000 || Socorro || LINEAR || — || align=right | 2.5 km || 
|-id=131 bgcolor=#fefefe
| 50131 ||  || — || January 5, 2000 || Socorro || LINEAR || FLO || align=right | 2.0 km || 
|-id=132 bgcolor=#fefefe
| 50132 ||  || — || January 5, 2000 || Socorro || LINEAR || — || align=right | 3.5 km || 
|-id=133 bgcolor=#fefefe
| 50133 ||  || — || January 5, 2000 || Socorro || LINEAR || V || align=right | 1.9 km || 
|-id=134 bgcolor=#fefefe
| 50134 ||  || — || January 5, 2000 || Socorro || LINEAR || — || align=right | 2.5 km || 
|-id=135 bgcolor=#fefefe
| 50135 ||  || — || January 5, 2000 || Socorro || LINEAR || — || align=right | 2.0 km || 
|-id=136 bgcolor=#E9E9E9
| 50136 ||  || — || January 5, 2000 || Socorro || LINEAR || RAF || align=right | 3.9 km || 
|-id=137 bgcolor=#E9E9E9
| 50137 ||  || — || January 5, 2000 || Socorro || LINEAR || — || align=right | 4.6 km || 
|-id=138 bgcolor=#fefefe
| 50138 ||  || — || January 5, 2000 || Socorro || LINEAR || V || align=right | 1.8 km || 
|-id=139 bgcolor=#fefefe
| 50139 ||  || — || January 5, 2000 || Socorro || LINEAR || — || align=right | 3.0 km || 
|-id=140 bgcolor=#E9E9E9
| 50140 ||  || — || January 5, 2000 || Socorro || LINEAR || — || align=right | 3.4 km || 
|-id=141 bgcolor=#fefefe
| 50141 ||  || — || January 5, 2000 || Socorro || LINEAR || FLO || align=right | 2.4 km || 
|-id=142 bgcolor=#E9E9E9
| 50142 ||  || — || January 5, 2000 || Socorro || LINEAR || — || align=right | 6.7 km || 
|-id=143 bgcolor=#FA8072
| 50143 ||  || — || January 3, 2000 || Socorro || LINEAR || — || align=right | 2.2 km || 
|-id=144 bgcolor=#fefefe
| 50144 ||  || — || January 3, 2000 || Socorro || LINEAR || — || align=right | 1.9 km || 
|-id=145 bgcolor=#fefefe
| 50145 ||  || — || January 4, 2000 || Socorro || LINEAR || — || align=right | 1.8 km || 
|-id=146 bgcolor=#E9E9E9
| 50146 ||  || — || January 4, 2000 || Socorro || LINEAR || — || align=right | 2.8 km || 
|-id=147 bgcolor=#fefefe
| 50147 ||  || — || January 4, 2000 || Socorro || LINEAR || — || align=right | 2.7 km || 
|-id=148 bgcolor=#fefefe
| 50148 ||  || — || January 4, 2000 || Socorro || LINEAR || V || align=right | 2.1 km || 
|-id=149 bgcolor=#E9E9E9
| 50149 ||  || — || January 4, 2000 || Socorro || LINEAR || EUN || align=right | 4.6 km || 
|-id=150 bgcolor=#E9E9E9
| 50150 ||  || — || January 4, 2000 || Socorro || LINEAR || — || align=right | 5.4 km || 
|-id=151 bgcolor=#fefefe
| 50151 ||  || — || January 5, 2000 || Socorro || LINEAR || — || align=right | 1.8 km || 
|-id=152 bgcolor=#fefefe
| 50152 ||  || — || January 5, 2000 || Socorro || LINEAR || — || align=right | 2.2 km || 
|-id=153 bgcolor=#fefefe
| 50153 ||  || — || January 5, 2000 || Socorro || LINEAR || — || align=right | 3.0 km || 
|-id=154 bgcolor=#fefefe
| 50154 ||  || — || January 5, 2000 || Socorro || LINEAR || — || align=right | 2.5 km || 
|-id=155 bgcolor=#fefefe
| 50155 ||  || — || January 5, 2000 || Socorro || LINEAR || FLO || align=right | 2.3 km || 
|-id=156 bgcolor=#fefefe
| 50156 ||  || — || January 5, 2000 || Socorro || LINEAR || — || align=right | 3.8 km || 
|-id=157 bgcolor=#d6d6d6
| 50157 ||  || — || January 5, 2000 || Socorro || LINEAR || — || align=right | 3.5 km || 
|-id=158 bgcolor=#fefefe
| 50158 ||  || — || January 5, 2000 || Socorro || LINEAR || — || align=right | 4.4 km || 
|-id=159 bgcolor=#fefefe
| 50159 ||  || — || January 5, 2000 || Socorro || LINEAR || V || align=right | 2.2 km || 
|-id=160 bgcolor=#fefefe
| 50160 ||  || — || January 5, 2000 || Socorro || LINEAR || — || align=right | 2.9 km || 
|-id=161 bgcolor=#fefefe
| 50161 ||  || — || January 5, 2000 || Socorro || LINEAR || — || align=right | 3.1 km || 
|-id=162 bgcolor=#fefefe
| 50162 ||  || — || January 7, 2000 || Socorro || LINEAR || PHO || align=right | 3.4 km || 
|-id=163 bgcolor=#E9E9E9
| 50163 ||  || — || January 7, 2000 || Socorro || LINEAR || — || align=right | 2.7 km || 
|-id=164 bgcolor=#fefefe
| 50164 ||  || — || January 7, 2000 || Socorro || LINEAR || — || align=right | 2.5 km || 
|-id=165 bgcolor=#fefefe
| 50165 ||  || — || January 5, 2000 || Socorro || LINEAR || — || align=right | 3.1 km || 
|-id=166 bgcolor=#fefefe
| 50166 ||  || — || January 8, 2000 || Socorro || LINEAR || — || align=right | 4.0 km || 
|-id=167 bgcolor=#fefefe
| 50167 ||  || — || January 3, 2000 || Socorro || LINEAR || V || align=right | 1.9 km || 
|-id=168 bgcolor=#fefefe
| 50168 ||  || — || January 3, 2000 || Socorro || LINEAR || — || align=right | 2.1 km || 
|-id=169 bgcolor=#fefefe
| 50169 ||  || — || January 3, 2000 || Socorro || LINEAR || NYS || align=right | 2.1 km || 
|-id=170 bgcolor=#fefefe
| 50170 ||  || — || January 3, 2000 || Socorro || LINEAR || NYS || align=right | 5.2 km || 
|-id=171 bgcolor=#E9E9E9
| 50171 ||  || — || January 3, 2000 || Socorro || LINEAR || — || align=right | 4.0 km || 
|-id=172 bgcolor=#fefefe
| 50172 ||  || — || January 3, 2000 || Socorro || LINEAR || NYS || align=right | 4.0 km || 
|-id=173 bgcolor=#fefefe
| 50173 ||  || — || January 3, 2000 || Socorro || LINEAR || — || align=right | 2.2 km || 
|-id=174 bgcolor=#E9E9E9
| 50174 ||  || — || January 3, 2000 || Socorro || LINEAR || — || align=right | 2.5 km || 
|-id=175 bgcolor=#fefefe
| 50175 ||  || — || January 3, 2000 || Socorro || LINEAR || — || align=right | 3.8 km || 
|-id=176 bgcolor=#E9E9E9
| 50176 ||  || — || January 5, 2000 || Socorro || LINEAR || slow || align=right | 3.9 km || 
|-id=177 bgcolor=#fefefe
| 50177 ||  || — || January 5, 2000 || Socorro || LINEAR || V || align=right | 1.6 km || 
|-id=178 bgcolor=#fefefe
| 50178 ||  || — || January 5, 2000 || Socorro || LINEAR || FLO || align=right | 1.7 km || 
|-id=179 bgcolor=#fefefe
| 50179 ||  || — || January 5, 2000 || Socorro || LINEAR || V || align=right | 1.5 km || 
|-id=180 bgcolor=#E9E9E9
| 50180 ||  || — || January 5, 2000 || Socorro || LINEAR || — || align=right | 3.9 km || 
|-id=181 bgcolor=#fefefe
| 50181 ||  || — || January 8, 2000 || Socorro || LINEAR || — || align=right | 2.4 km || 
|-id=182 bgcolor=#d6d6d6
| 50182 ||  || — || January 8, 2000 || Socorro || LINEAR || VER || align=right | 12 km || 
|-id=183 bgcolor=#E9E9E9
| 50183 ||  || — || January 8, 2000 || Socorro || LINEAR || EUN || align=right | 4.6 km || 
|-id=184 bgcolor=#E9E9E9
| 50184 ||  || — || January 13, 2000 || Kleť || Kleť Obs. || — || align=right | 3.2 km || 
|-id=185 bgcolor=#fefefe
| 50185 ||  || — || January 7, 2000 || Socorro || LINEAR || PHO || align=right | 4.0 km || 
|-id=186 bgcolor=#fefefe
| 50186 ||  || — || January 7, 2000 || Socorro || LINEAR || V || align=right | 1.7 km || 
|-id=187 bgcolor=#fefefe
| 50187 ||  || — || January 7, 2000 || Socorro || LINEAR || — || align=right | 4.5 km || 
|-id=188 bgcolor=#fefefe
| 50188 ||  || — || January 7, 2000 || Socorro || LINEAR || V || align=right | 1.4 km || 
|-id=189 bgcolor=#E9E9E9
| 50189 ||  || — || January 8, 2000 || Socorro || LINEAR || MAR || align=right | 3.8 km || 
|-id=190 bgcolor=#E9E9E9
| 50190 ||  || — || January 8, 2000 || Socorro || LINEAR || — || align=right | 7.1 km || 
|-id=191 bgcolor=#E9E9E9
| 50191 ||  || — || January 8, 2000 || Socorro || LINEAR || EUN || align=right | 3.5 km || 
|-id=192 bgcolor=#fefefe
| 50192 ||  || — || January 8, 2000 || Socorro || LINEAR || — || align=right | 3.2 km || 
|-id=193 bgcolor=#E9E9E9
| 50193 ||  || — || January 8, 2000 || Socorro || LINEAR || — || align=right | 5.5 km || 
|-id=194 bgcolor=#fefefe
| 50194 ||  || — || January 8, 2000 || Socorro || LINEAR || — || align=right | 2.0 km || 
|-id=195 bgcolor=#fefefe
| 50195 ||  || — || January 8, 2000 || Socorro || LINEAR || — || align=right | 3.7 km || 
|-id=196 bgcolor=#fefefe
| 50196 ||  || — || January 8, 2000 || Socorro || LINEAR || V || align=right | 2.9 km || 
|-id=197 bgcolor=#E9E9E9
| 50197 ||  || — || January 8, 2000 || Socorro || LINEAR || — || align=right | 3.1 km || 
|-id=198 bgcolor=#E9E9E9
| 50198 ||  || — || January 8, 2000 || Socorro || LINEAR || — || align=right | 3.8 km || 
|-id=199 bgcolor=#fefefe
| 50199 ||  || — || January 9, 2000 || Socorro || LINEAR || — || align=right | 2.8 km || 
|-id=200 bgcolor=#E9E9E9
| 50200 ||  || — || January 10, 2000 || Socorro || LINEAR || EUN || align=right | 5.8 km || 
|}

50201–50300 

|-bgcolor=#E9E9E9
| 50201 ||  || — || January 10, 2000 || Socorro || LINEAR || MAR || align=right | 4.1 km || 
|-id=202 bgcolor=#E9E9E9
| 50202 ||  || — || January 10, 2000 || Socorro || LINEAR || — || align=right | 4.0 km || 
|-id=203 bgcolor=#E9E9E9
| 50203 ||  || — || January 10, 2000 || Socorro || LINEAR || EUN || align=right | 4.5 km || 
|-id=204 bgcolor=#E9E9E9
| 50204 ||  || — || January 10, 2000 || Socorro || LINEAR || — || align=right | 4.8 km || 
|-id=205 bgcolor=#E9E9E9
| 50205 ||  || — || January 8, 2000 || Socorro || LINEAR || — || align=right | 3.0 km || 
|-id=206 bgcolor=#fefefe
| 50206 ||  || — || January 5, 2000 || Kitt Peak || Spacewatch || — || align=right | 2.4 km || 
|-id=207 bgcolor=#E9E9E9
| 50207 ||  || — || January 5, 2000 || Kitt Peak || Spacewatch || — || align=right | 4.9 km || 
|-id=208 bgcolor=#E9E9E9
| 50208 ||  || — || January 8, 2000 || Kitt Peak || Spacewatch || — || align=right | 3.8 km || 
|-id=209 bgcolor=#fefefe
| 50209 ||  || — || January 11, 2000 || Kitt Peak || Spacewatch || NYS || align=right | 1.6 km || 
|-id=210 bgcolor=#E9E9E9
| 50210 ||  || — || January 13, 2000 || Kitt Peak || Spacewatch || — || align=right | 4.1 km || 
|-id=211 bgcolor=#E9E9E9
| 50211 ||  || — || January 4, 2000 || Socorro || LINEAR || — || align=right | 3.4 km || 
|-id=212 bgcolor=#E9E9E9
| 50212 ||  || — || January 4, 2000 || Socorro || LINEAR || — || align=right | 3.4 km || 
|-id=213 bgcolor=#fefefe
| 50213 ||  || — || January 5, 2000 || Socorro || LINEAR || — || align=right | 2.2 km || 
|-id=214 bgcolor=#fefefe
| 50214 ||  || — || January 5, 2000 || Socorro || LINEAR || — || align=right | 1.4 km || 
|-id=215 bgcolor=#fefefe
| 50215 ||  || — || January 5, 2000 || Anderson Mesa || LONEOS || — || align=right | 2.9 km || 
|-id=216 bgcolor=#fefefe
| 50216 ||  || — || January 5, 2000 || Socorro || LINEAR || FLO || align=right | 3.1 km || 
|-id=217 bgcolor=#fefefe
| 50217 ||  || — || January 5, 2000 || Socorro || LINEAR || V || align=right | 2.5 km || 
|-id=218 bgcolor=#fefefe
| 50218 ||  || — || January 5, 2000 || Socorro || LINEAR || — || align=right | 2.5 km || 
|-id=219 bgcolor=#E9E9E9
| 50219 ||  || — || January 5, 2000 || Socorro || LINEAR || EUN || align=right | 5.5 km || 
|-id=220 bgcolor=#d6d6d6
| 50220 ||  || — || January 5, 2000 || Socorro || LINEAR || — || align=right | 11 km || 
|-id=221 bgcolor=#fefefe
| 50221 ||  || — || January 6, 2000 || Socorro || LINEAR || — || align=right | 2.7 km || 
|-id=222 bgcolor=#E9E9E9
| 50222 ||  || — || January 6, 2000 || Socorro || LINEAR || — || align=right | 3.4 km || 
|-id=223 bgcolor=#fefefe
| 50223 ||  || — || January 6, 2000 || Socorro || LINEAR || NYS || align=right | 1.3 km || 
|-id=224 bgcolor=#E9E9E9
| 50224 ||  || — || January 6, 2000 || Socorro || LINEAR || — || align=right | 5.3 km || 
|-id=225 bgcolor=#fefefe
| 50225 ||  || — || January 6, 2000 || Anderson Mesa || LONEOS || — || align=right | 2.4 km || 
|-id=226 bgcolor=#fefefe
| 50226 ||  || — || January 7, 2000 || Socorro || LINEAR || — || align=right | 3.0 km || 
|-id=227 bgcolor=#E9E9E9
| 50227 ||  || — || January 7, 2000 || Anderson Mesa || LONEOS || — || align=right | 2.5 km || 
|-id=228 bgcolor=#fefefe
| 50228 ||  || — || January 7, 2000 || Anderson Mesa || LONEOS || — || align=right | 3.6 km || 
|-id=229 bgcolor=#fefefe
| 50229 ||  || — || January 7, 2000 || Socorro || LINEAR || — || align=right | 2.5 km || 
|-id=230 bgcolor=#d6d6d6
| 50230 ||  || — || January 8, 2000 || Socorro || LINEAR || EOS || align=right | 6.6 km || 
|-id=231 bgcolor=#E9E9E9
| 50231 ||  || — || January 10, 2000 || Socorro || LINEAR || — || align=right | 3.9 km || 
|-id=232 bgcolor=#E9E9E9
| 50232 ||  || — || January 10, 2000 || Socorro || LINEAR || EUN || align=right | 4.0 km || 
|-id=233 bgcolor=#fefefe
| 50233 ||  || — || January 13, 2000 || Xinglong || SCAP || — || align=right | 2.1 km || 
|-id=234 bgcolor=#fefefe
| 50234 || 2000 BP || — || January 27, 2000 || Prescott || P. G. Comba || V || align=right | 1.9 km || 
|-id=235 bgcolor=#E9E9E9
| 50235 ||  || — || January 27, 2000 || Kitt Peak || Spacewatch || — || align=right | 4.5 km || 
|-id=236 bgcolor=#fefefe
| 50236 ||  || — || January 26, 2000 || Višnjan Observatory || K. Korlević || — || align=right | 4.1 km || 
|-id=237 bgcolor=#d6d6d6
| 50237 ||  || — || January 27, 2000 || Oizumi || T. Kobayashi || — || align=right | 7.8 km || 
|-id=238 bgcolor=#fefefe
| 50238 ||  || — || January 27, 2000 || Oizumi || T. Kobayashi || — || align=right | 2.6 km || 
|-id=239 bgcolor=#fefefe
| 50239 ||  || — || January 27, 2000 || Oizumi || T. Kobayashi || SUL || align=right | 9.2 km || 
|-id=240 bgcolor=#E9E9E9
| 50240 Cortina ||  ||  || January 28, 2000 || Cortina d'Ampezzo || A. Dimai || — || align=right | 3.5 km || 
|-id=241 bgcolor=#fefefe
| 50241 ||  || — || January 29, 2000 || Socorro || LINEAR || V || align=right | 1.8 km || 
|-id=242 bgcolor=#fefefe
| 50242 ||  || — || January 26, 2000 || Kitt Peak || Spacewatch || MAS || align=right | 2.4 km || 
|-id=243 bgcolor=#E9E9E9
| 50243 ||  || — || January 29, 2000 || Kitt Peak || Spacewatch || MIS || align=right | 6.7 km || 
|-id=244 bgcolor=#fefefe
| 50244 ||  || — || January 28, 2000 || Kitt Peak || Spacewatch || MAS || align=right | 2.2 km || 
|-id=245 bgcolor=#fefefe
| 50245 ||  || — || January 28, 2000 || Oizumi || T. Kobayashi || — || align=right | 2.6 km || 
|-id=246 bgcolor=#E9E9E9
| 50246 ||  || — || January 28, 2000 || Oizumi || T. Kobayashi || — || align=right | 13 km || 
|-id=247 bgcolor=#E9E9E9
| 50247 ||  || — || January 31, 2000 || Oizumi || T. Kobayashi || — || align=right | 9.2 km || 
|-id=248 bgcolor=#fefefe
| 50248 ||  || — || January 29, 2000 || Socorro || LINEAR || V || align=right | 1.8 km || 
|-id=249 bgcolor=#E9E9E9
| 50249 ||  || — || January 30, 2000 || Socorro || LINEAR || EUN || align=right | 2.6 km || 
|-id=250 bgcolor=#E9E9E9
| 50250 Daveharrington ||  ||  || January 30, 2000 || Catalina || CSS || — || align=right | 3.7 km || 
|-id=251 bgcolor=#E9E9E9
| 50251 Iorg ||  ||  || January 30, 2000 || Catalina || CSS || — || align=right | 4.5 km || 
|-id=252 bgcolor=#fefefe
| 50252 ||  || — || January 30, 2000 || Catalina || CSS || FLO || align=right | 1.6 km || 
|-id=253 bgcolor=#E9E9E9
| 50253 ||  || — || January 29, 2000 || Socorro || LINEAR || MAR || align=right | 3.8 km || 
|-id=254 bgcolor=#fefefe
| 50254 ||  || — || January 30, 2000 || Socorro || LINEAR || — || align=right | 2.2 km || 
|-id=255 bgcolor=#E9E9E9
| 50255 ||  || — || January 30, 2000 || Socorro || LINEAR || — || align=right | 3.3 km || 
|-id=256 bgcolor=#fefefe
| 50256 ||  || — || January 30, 2000 || Socorro || LINEAR || — || align=right | 2.0 km || 
|-id=257 bgcolor=#fefefe
| 50257 ||  || — || January 30, 2000 || Socorro || LINEAR || NYS || align=right | 1.8 km || 
|-id=258 bgcolor=#E9E9E9
| 50258 ||  || — || January 30, 2000 || Socorro || LINEAR || — || align=right | 4.1 km || 
|-id=259 bgcolor=#E9E9E9
| 50259 ||  || — || January 30, 2000 || Socorro || LINEAR || — || align=right | 4.1 km || 
|-id=260 bgcolor=#fefefe
| 50260 ||  || — || January 30, 2000 || Socorro || LINEAR || — || align=right | 2.4 km || 
|-id=261 bgcolor=#fefefe
| 50261 ||  || — || January 30, 2000 || Socorro || LINEAR || NYS || align=right | 2.0 km || 
|-id=262 bgcolor=#fefefe
| 50262 ||  || — || January 30, 2000 || Socorro || LINEAR || NYS || align=right | 1.7 km || 
|-id=263 bgcolor=#E9E9E9
| 50263 ||  || — || January 30, 2000 || Socorro || LINEAR || — || align=right | 3.8 km || 
|-id=264 bgcolor=#d6d6d6
| 50264 ||  || — || January 30, 2000 || Socorro || LINEAR || — || align=right | 8.8 km || 
|-id=265 bgcolor=#fefefe
| 50265 ||  || — || January 31, 2000 || Socorro || LINEAR || — || align=right | 2.7 km || 
|-id=266 bgcolor=#E9E9E9
| 50266 ||  || — || January 30, 2000 || Socorro || LINEAR || GEF || align=right | 3.8 km || 
|-id=267 bgcolor=#E9E9E9
| 50267 ||  || — || January 29, 2000 || Socorro || LINEAR || — || align=right | 2.9 km || 
|-id=268 bgcolor=#E9E9E9
| 50268 ||  || — || January 30, 2000 || Socorro || LINEAR || WIT || align=right | 2.6 km || 
|-id=269 bgcolor=#fefefe
| 50269 ||  || — || January 30, 2000 || Socorro || LINEAR || V || align=right | 2.5 km || 
|-id=270 bgcolor=#fefefe
| 50270 || 2000 CJ || — || February 2, 2000 || Prescott || P. G. Comba || FLO || align=right | 1.5 km || 
|-id=271 bgcolor=#E9E9E9
| 50271 || 2000 CW || — || February 1, 2000 || Catalina || CSS || — || align=right | 4.1 km || 
|-id=272 bgcolor=#E9E9E9
| 50272 || 2000 CZ || — || February 3, 2000 || Višnjan Observatory || K. Korlević || — || align=right | 3.9 km || 
|-id=273 bgcolor=#E9E9E9
| 50273 ||  || — || February 3, 2000 || Višnjan Observatory || K. Korlević || — || align=right | 2.9 km || 
|-id=274 bgcolor=#fefefe
| 50274 ||  || — || February 4, 2000 || Višnjan Observatory || K. Korlević || — || align=right | 2.0 km || 
|-id=275 bgcolor=#E9E9E9
| 50275 ||  || — || February 4, 2000 || San Marcello || M. Tombelli, A. Boattini || — || align=right | 6.9 km || 
|-id=276 bgcolor=#E9E9E9
| 50276 ||  || — || February 4, 2000 || Oizumi || T. Kobayashi || MAR || align=right | 4.2 km || 
|-id=277 bgcolor=#E9E9E9
| 50277 ||  || — || February 2, 2000 || Socorro || LINEAR || — || align=right | 3.0 km || 
|-id=278 bgcolor=#E9E9E9
| 50278 ||  || — || February 2, 2000 || Socorro || LINEAR || — || align=right | 3.4 km || 
|-id=279 bgcolor=#E9E9E9
| 50279 ||  || — || February 2, 2000 || Socorro || LINEAR || — || align=right | 5.5 km || 
|-id=280 bgcolor=#E9E9E9
| 50280 ||  || — || February 2, 2000 || Socorro || LINEAR || — || align=right | 3.4 km || 
|-id=281 bgcolor=#E9E9E9
| 50281 ||  || — || February 2, 2000 || Socorro || LINEAR || EUN || align=right | 4.1 km || 
|-id=282 bgcolor=#E9E9E9
| 50282 ||  || — || February 2, 2000 || Socorro || LINEAR || — || align=right | 2.4 km || 
|-id=283 bgcolor=#E9E9E9
| 50283 ||  || — || February 2, 2000 || Socorro || LINEAR || HOF || align=right | 5.6 km || 
|-id=284 bgcolor=#E9E9E9
| 50284 ||  || — || February 2, 2000 || Socorro || LINEAR || NEM || align=right | 6.2 km || 
|-id=285 bgcolor=#fefefe
| 50285 ||  || — || February 2, 2000 || Socorro || LINEAR || — || align=right | 5.7 km || 
|-id=286 bgcolor=#fefefe
| 50286 ||  || — || February 2, 2000 || Socorro || LINEAR || MAS || align=right | 1.8 km || 
|-id=287 bgcolor=#d6d6d6
| 50287 ||  || — || February 2, 2000 || Socorro || LINEAR || — || align=right | 3.8 km || 
|-id=288 bgcolor=#E9E9E9
| 50288 ||  || — || February 2, 2000 || Socorro || LINEAR || — || align=right | 8.2 km || 
|-id=289 bgcolor=#E9E9E9
| 50289 ||  || — || February 2, 2000 || Socorro || LINEAR || — || align=right | 3.6 km || 
|-id=290 bgcolor=#fefefe
| 50290 ||  || — || February 2, 2000 || Socorro || LINEAR || FLO || align=right | 3.7 km || 
|-id=291 bgcolor=#E9E9E9
| 50291 ||  || — || February 2, 2000 || Socorro || LINEAR || — || align=right | 4.0 km || 
|-id=292 bgcolor=#fefefe
| 50292 ||  || — || February 2, 2000 || Socorro || LINEAR || — || align=right | 2.2 km || 
|-id=293 bgcolor=#E9E9E9
| 50293 ||  || — || February 2, 2000 || Socorro || LINEAR || — || align=right | 4.1 km || 
|-id=294 bgcolor=#fefefe
| 50294 ||  || — || February 2, 2000 || Socorro || LINEAR || CLA || align=right | 3.4 km || 
|-id=295 bgcolor=#E9E9E9
| 50295 ||  || — || February 2, 2000 || Socorro || LINEAR || HEN || align=right | 2.7 km || 
|-id=296 bgcolor=#E9E9E9
| 50296 ||  || — || February 2, 2000 || Socorro || LINEAR || — || align=right | 7.2 km || 
|-id=297 bgcolor=#fefefe
| 50297 ||  || — || February 4, 2000 || Višnjan Observatory || K. Korlević || — || align=right | 3.1 km || 
|-id=298 bgcolor=#E9E9E9
| 50298 ||  || — || February 4, 2000 || Višnjan Observatory || K. Korlević || HEN || align=right | 2.9 km || 
|-id=299 bgcolor=#fefefe
| 50299 ||  || — || February 4, 2000 || Višnjan Observatory || K. Korlević || — || align=right | 2.6 km || 
|-id=300 bgcolor=#E9E9E9
| 50300 ||  || — || February 5, 2000 || Višnjan Observatory || K. Korlević || — || align=right | 2.7 km || 
|}

50301–50400 

|-bgcolor=#fefefe
| 50301 ||  || — || February 2, 2000 || Socorro || LINEAR || FLO || align=right | 1.6 km || 
|-id=302 bgcolor=#E9E9E9
| 50302 ||  || — || February 2, 2000 || Socorro || LINEAR || — || align=right | 5.4 km || 
|-id=303 bgcolor=#fefefe
| 50303 ||  || — || February 2, 2000 || Socorro || LINEAR || — || align=right | 4.4 km || 
|-id=304 bgcolor=#E9E9E9
| 50304 ||  || — || February 2, 2000 || Socorro || LINEAR || — || align=right | 4.0 km || 
|-id=305 bgcolor=#fefefe
| 50305 ||  || — || February 2, 2000 || Socorro || LINEAR || — || align=right | 2.6 km || 
|-id=306 bgcolor=#d6d6d6
| 50306 ||  || — || February 3, 2000 || Socorro || LINEAR || — || align=right | 7.8 km || 
|-id=307 bgcolor=#E9E9E9
| 50307 ||  || — || February 4, 2000 || Socorro || LINEAR || — || align=right | 4.5 km || 
|-id=308 bgcolor=#fefefe
| 50308 ||  || — || February 4, 2000 || Socorro || LINEAR || — || align=right | 2.3 km || 
|-id=309 bgcolor=#E9E9E9
| 50309 ||  || — || February 4, 2000 || Gekko || T. Kagawa || — || align=right | 3.5 km || 
|-id=310 bgcolor=#E9E9E9
| 50310 ||  || — || February 1, 2000 || Catalina || CSS || — || align=right | 3.9 km || 
|-id=311 bgcolor=#fefefe
| 50311 ||  || — || February 2, 2000 || Socorro || LINEAR || — || align=right | 3.0 km || 
|-id=312 bgcolor=#E9E9E9
| 50312 ||  || — || February 2, 2000 || Socorro || LINEAR || — || align=right | 3.8 km || 
|-id=313 bgcolor=#E9E9E9
| 50313 ||  || — || February 2, 2000 || Socorro || LINEAR || — || align=right | 3.6 km || 
|-id=314 bgcolor=#fefefe
| 50314 ||  || — || February 2, 2000 || Socorro || LINEAR || — || align=right | 1.7 km || 
|-id=315 bgcolor=#E9E9E9
| 50315 ||  || — || February 2, 2000 || Socorro || LINEAR || — || align=right | 2.9 km || 
|-id=316 bgcolor=#d6d6d6
| 50316 ||  || — || February 2, 2000 || Socorro || LINEAR || — || align=right | 3.5 km || 
|-id=317 bgcolor=#E9E9E9
| 50317 ||  || — || February 2, 2000 || Socorro || LINEAR || — || align=right | 3.0 km || 
|-id=318 bgcolor=#fefefe
| 50318 ||  || — || February 2, 2000 || Socorro || LINEAR || V || align=right | 1.6 km || 
|-id=319 bgcolor=#d6d6d6
| 50319 ||  || — || February 2, 2000 || Socorro || LINEAR || — || align=right | 7.3 km || 
|-id=320 bgcolor=#E9E9E9
| 50320 ||  || — || February 2, 2000 || Socorro || LINEAR || DOR || align=right | 7.1 km || 
|-id=321 bgcolor=#E9E9E9
| 50321 ||  || — || February 2, 2000 || Socorro || LINEAR || — || align=right | 9.8 km || 
|-id=322 bgcolor=#d6d6d6
| 50322 ||  || — || February 2, 2000 || Socorro || LINEAR || — || align=right | 6.7 km || 
|-id=323 bgcolor=#E9E9E9
| 50323 ||  || — || February 2, 2000 || Socorro || LINEAR || — || align=right | 2.3 km || 
|-id=324 bgcolor=#fefefe
| 50324 ||  || — || February 2, 2000 || Socorro || LINEAR || V || align=right | 3.0 km || 
|-id=325 bgcolor=#E9E9E9
| 50325 ||  || — || February 2, 2000 || Socorro || LINEAR || MAR || align=right | 4.7 km || 
|-id=326 bgcolor=#E9E9E9
| 50326 ||  || — || February 2, 2000 || Socorro || LINEAR || — || align=right | 3.0 km || 
|-id=327 bgcolor=#E9E9E9
| 50327 ||  || — || February 4, 2000 || Socorro || LINEAR || — || align=right | 4.2 km || 
|-id=328 bgcolor=#fefefe
| 50328 ||  || — || February 4, 2000 || Socorro || LINEAR || — || align=right | 1.5 km || 
|-id=329 bgcolor=#fefefe
| 50329 ||  || — || February 4, 2000 || Socorro || LINEAR || V || align=right | 2.5 km || 
|-id=330 bgcolor=#d6d6d6
| 50330 ||  || — || February 10, 2000 || Socorro || LINEAR || — || align=right | 15 km || 
|-id=331 bgcolor=#E9E9E9
| 50331 ||  || — || February 4, 2000 || Socorro || LINEAR || — || align=right | 3.8 km || 
|-id=332 bgcolor=#E9E9E9
| 50332 ||  || — || February 5, 2000 || Socorro || LINEAR || — || align=right | 4.2 km || 
|-id=333 bgcolor=#E9E9E9
| 50333 ||  || — || February 5, 2000 || Socorro || LINEAR || — || align=right | 5.0 km || 
|-id=334 bgcolor=#E9E9E9
| 50334 ||  || — || February 5, 2000 || Socorro || LINEAR || ADE || align=right | 11 km || 
|-id=335 bgcolor=#fefefe
| 50335 ||  || — || February 5, 2000 || Socorro || LINEAR || — || align=right | 3.7 km || 
|-id=336 bgcolor=#E9E9E9
| 50336 ||  || — || February 2, 2000 || Socorro || LINEAR || — || align=right | 2.8 km || 
|-id=337 bgcolor=#fefefe
| 50337 ||  || — || February 2, 2000 || Socorro || LINEAR || NYS || align=right | 1.3 km || 
|-id=338 bgcolor=#fefefe
| 50338 ||  || — || February 2, 2000 || Socorro || LINEAR || FLO || align=right | 2.0 km || 
|-id=339 bgcolor=#E9E9E9
| 50339 ||  || — || February 2, 2000 || Socorro || LINEAR || GEF || align=right | 6.4 km || 
|-id=340 bgcolor=#E9E9E9
| 50340 ||  || — || February 2, 2000 || Socorro || LINEAR || — || align=right | 6.9 km || 
|-id=341 bgcolor=#E9E9E9
| 50341 ||  || — || February 2, 2000 || Socorro || LINEAR || — || align=right | 3.2 km || 
|-id=342 bgcolor=#fefefe
| 50342 ||  || — || February 2, 2000 || Socorro || LINEAR || — || align=right | 1.7 km || 
|-id=343 bgcolor=#E9E9E9
| 50343 ||  || — || February 3, 2000 || Socorro || LINEAR || — || align=right | 5.1 km || 
|-id=344 bgcolor=#E9E9E9
| 50344 ||  || — || February 3, 2000 || Socorro || LINEAR || — || align=right | 5.7 km || 
|-id=345 bgcolor=#E9E9E9
| 50345 ||  || — || February 4, 2000 || Socorro || LINEAR || — || align=right | 3.6 km || 
|-id=346 bgcolor=#E9E9E9
| 50346 ||  || — || February 4, 2000 || Socorro || LINEAR || — || align=right | 3.1 km || 
|-id=347 bgcolor=#fefefe
| 50347 ||  || — || February 6, 2000 || Socorro || LINEAR || V || align=right | 1.5 km || 
|-id=348 bgcolor=#fefefe
| 50348 ||  || — || February 1, 2000 || Kitt Peak || Spacewatch || NYS || align=right | 1.7 km || 
|-id=349 bgcolor=#fefefe
| 50349 ||  || — || February 2, 2000 || Socorro || LINEAR || — || align=right | 3.8 km || 
|-id=350 bgcolor=#E9E9E9
| 50350 ||  || — || February 6, 2000 || Socorro || LINEAR || GEF || align=right | 4.6 km || 
|-id=351 bgcolor=#E9E9E9
| 50351 ||  || — || February 6, 2000 || Socorro || LINEAR || — || align=right | 3.6 km || 
|-id=352 bgcolor=#E9E9E9
| 50352 ||  || — || February 7, 2000 || Socorro || LINEAR || — || align=right | 5.6 km || 
|-id=353 bgcolor=#fefefe
| 50353 ||  || — || February 7, 2000 || Socorro || LINEAR || — || align=right | 4.1 km || 
|-id=354 bgcolor=#FA8072
| 50354 ||  || — || February 7, 2000 || Socorro || LINEAR || — || align=right | 2.1 km || 
|-id=355 bgcolor=#fefefe
| 50355 ||  || — || February 7, 2000 || Socorro || LINEAR || V || align=right | 2.8 km || 
|-id=356 bgcolor=#E9E9E9
| 50356 ||  || — || February 7, 2000 || Socorro || LINEAR || — || align=right | 3.6 km || 
|-id=357 bgcolor=#fefefe
| 50357 ||  || — || February 7, 2000 || Socorro || LINEAR || NYS || align=right | 1.9 km || 
|-id=358 bgcolor=#E9E9E9
| 50358 ||  || — || February 7, 2000 || Socorro || LINEAR || ADE || align=right | 6.6 km || 
|-id=359 bgcolor=#fefefe
| 50359 ||  || — || February 2, 2000 || Socorro || LINEAR || V || align=right | 2.4 km || 
|-id=360 bgcolor=#E9E9E9
| 50360 ||  || — || February 7, 2000 || Socorro || LINEAR || — || align=right | 3.4 km || 
|-id=361 bgcolor=#fefefe
| 50361 ||  || — || February 5, 2000 || Višnjan Observatory || K. Korlević || V || align=right | 2.0 km || 
|-id=362 bgcolor=#fefefe
| 50362 ||  || — || February 10, 2000 || Višnjan Observatory || K. Korlević || NYS || align=right | 2.5 km || 
|-id=363 bgcolor=#E9E9E9
| 50363 ||  || — || February 10, 2000 || Višnjan Observatory || K. Korlević || EUN || align=right | 6.2 km || 
|-id=364 bgcolor=#E9E9E9
| 50364 ||  || — || February 10, 2000 || Višnjan Observatory || K. Korlević || — || align=right | 9.2 km || 
|-id=365 bgcolor=#E9E9E9
| 50365 ||  || — || February 7, 2000 || Siding Spring || R. H. McNaught || — || align=right | 2.9 km || 
|-id=366 bgcolor=#fefefe
| 50366 ||  || — || February 7, 2000 || Kitt Peak || Spacewatch || V || align=right | 1.4 km || 
|-id=367 bgcolor=#d6d6d6
| 50367 ||  || — || February 8, 2000 || Kitt Peak || Spacewatch || — || align=right | 6.1 km || 
|-id=368 bgcolor=#fefefe
| 50368 ||  || — || February 4, 2000 || Socorro || LINEAR || NYS || align=right | 1.6 km || 
|-id=369 bgcolor=#E9E9E9
| 50369 ||  || — || February 4, 2000 || Socorro || LINEAR || — || align=right | 3.9 km || 
|-id=370 bgcolor=#E9E9E9
| 50370 ||  || — || February 4, 2000 || Socorro || LINEAR || — || align=right | 3.7 km || 
|-id=371 bgcolor=#d6d6d6
| 50371 ||  || — || February 4, 2000 || Socorro || LINEAR || EOS || align=right | 6.8 km || 
|-id=372 bgcolor=#E9E9E9
| 50372 ||  || — || February 4, 2000 || Socorro || LINEAR || — || align=right | 4.6 km || 
|-id=373 bgcolor=#fefefe
| 50373 ||  || — || February 4, 2000 || Socorro || LINEAR || ERI || align=right | 3.7 km || 
|-id=374 bgcolor=#E9E9E9
| 50374 ||  || — || February 4, 2000 || Socorro || LINEAR || — || align=right | 3.5 km || 
|-id=375 bgcolor=#fefefe
| 50375 ||  || — || February 4, 2000 || Socorro || LINEAR || NYS || align=right | 1.9 km || 
|-id=376 bgcolor=#fefefe
| 50376 ||  || — || February 4, 2000 || Socorro || LINEAR || FLO || align=right | 2.4 km || 
|-id=377 bgcolor=#d6d6d6
| 50377 ||  || — || February 4, 2000 || Socorro || LINEAR || KOR || align=right | 3.9 km || 
|-id=378 bgcolor=#d6d6d6
| 50378 ||  || — || February 4, 2000 || Socorro || LINEAR || — || align=right | 10 km || 
|-id=379 bgcolor=#E9E9E9
| 50379 ||  || — || February 4, 2000 || Socorro || LINEAR || — || align=right | 6.8 km || 
|-id=380 bgcolor=#E9E9E9
| 50380 ||  || — || February 4, 2000 || Socorro || LINEAR || EUN || align=right | 5.8 km || 
|-id=381 bgcolor=#E9E9E9
| 50381 ||  || — || February 4, 2000 || Socorro || LINEAR || — || align=right | 4.7 km || 
|-id=382 bgcolor=#E9E9E9
| 50382 ||  || — || February 4, 2000 || Socorro || LINEAR || NEM || align=right | 7.0 km || 
|-id=383 bgcolor=#E9E9E9
| 50383 ||  || — || February 4, 2000 || Socorro || LINEAR || — || align=right | 2.9 km || 
|-id=384 bgcolor=#E9E9E9
| 50384 ||  || — || February 4, 2000 || Socorro || LINEAR || HNS || align=right | 3.9 km || 
|-id=385 bgcolor=#E9E9E9
| 50385 ||  || — || February 5, 2000 || Socorro || LINEAR || — || align=right | 3.9 km || 
|-id=386 bgcolor=#fefefe
| 50386 ||  || — || February 6, 2000 || Socorro || LINEAR || FLO || align=right | 1.9 km || 
|-id=387 bgcolor=#E9E9E9
| 50387 ||  || — || February 6, 2000 || Socorro || LINEAR || — || align=right | 5.9 km || 
|-id=388 bgcolor=#d6d6d6
| 50388 ||  || — || February 6, 2000 || Socorro || LINEAR || THM || align=right | 7.7 km || 
|-id=389 bgcolor=#E9E9E9
| 50389 ||  || — || February 6, 2000 || Socorro || LINEAR || — || align=right | 4.7 km || 
|-id=390 bgcolor=#E9E9E9
| 50390 ||  || — || February 6, 2000 || Socorro || LINEAR || GEF || align=right | 3.4 km || 
|-id=391 bgcolor=#E9E9E9
| 50391 ||  || — || February 6, 2000 || Socorro || LINEAR || — || align=right | 4.5 km || 
|-id=392 bgcolor=#d6d6d6
| 50392 ||  || — || February 8, 2000 || Socorro || LINEAR || EOS || align=right | 5.6 km || 
|-id=393 bgcolor=#E9E9E9
| 50393 ||  || — || February 8, 2000 || Socorro || LINEAR || — || align=right | 7.8 km || 
|-id=394 bgcolor=#E9E9E9
| 50394 ||  || — || February 8, 2000 || Socorro || LINEAR || — || align=right | 9.2 km || 
|-id=395 bgcolor=#E9E9E9
| 50395 ||  || — || February 8, 2000 || Socorro || LINEAR || — || align=right | 3.8 km || 
|-id=396 bgcolor=#fefefe
| 50396 ||  || — || February 8, 2000 || Socorro || LINEAR || — || align=right | 2.5 km || 
|-id=397 bgcolor=#E9E9E9
| 50397 ||  || — || February 8, 2000 || Socorro || LINEAR || — || align=right | 5.7 km || 
|-id=398 bgcolor=#fefefe
| 50398 ||  || — || February 6, 2000 || Socorro || LINEAR || — || align=right | 2.1 km || 
|-id=399 bgcolor=#E9E9E9
| 50399 ||  || — || February 2, 2000 || Socorro || LINEAR || — || align=right | 6.4 km || 
|-id=400 bgcolor=#E9E9E9
| 50400 ||  || — || February 2, 2000 || Socorro || LINEAR || — || align=right | 2.7 km || 
|}

50401–50500 

|-bgcolor=#fefefe
| 50401 ||  || — || February 5, 2000 || Catalina || CSS || — || align=right | 2.7 km || 
|-id=402 bgcolor=#E9E9E9
| 50402 ||  || — || February 6, 2000 || Catalina || CSS || — || align=right | 4.0 km || 
|-id=403 bgcolor=#fefefe
| 50403 ||  || — || February 15, 2000 || Socorro || LINEAR || PHO || align=right | 6.6 km || 
|-id=404 bgcolor=#d6d6d6
| 50404 ||  || — || February 2, 2000 || Catalina || CSS || EOS || align=right | 5.2 km || 
|-id=405 bgcolor=#fefefe
| 50405 ||  || — || February 2, 2000 || Catalina || CSS || V || align=right | 1.7 km || 
|-id=406 bgcolor=#E9E9E9
| 50406 ||  || — || February 3, 2000 || Socorro || LINEAR || — || align=right | 4.0 km || 
|-id=407 bgcolor=#d6d6d6
| 50407 ||  || — || February 3, 2000 || Socorro || LINEAR || KOR || align=right | 3.2 km || 
|-id=408 bgcolor=#E9E9E9
| 50408 ||  || — || February 3, 2000 || Socorro || LINEAR || — || align=right | 3.9 km || 
|-id=409 bgcolor=#E9E9E9
| 50409 ||  || — || February 3, 2000 || Socorro || LINEAR || — || align=right | 3.8 km || 
|-id=410 bgcolor=#E9E9E9
| 50410 ||  || — || February 4, 2000 || Socorro || LINEAR || — || align=right | 4.5 km || 
|-id=411 bgcolor=#d6d6d6
| 50411 || 2000 DS || — || February 24, 2000 || Oizumi || T. Kobayashi || — || align=right | 12 km || 
|-id=412 bgcolor=#E9E9E9
| 50412 Ewen ||  ||  || February 26, 2000 || Rock Finder || W. K. Y. Yeung || HEN || align=right | 5.5 km || 
|-id=413 bgcolor=#E9E9E9
| 50413 Petrginz ||  ||  || February 27, 2000 || Kleť || J. Tichá, M. Tichý || GEF || align=right | 3.3 km || 
|-id=414 bgcolor=#d6d6d6
| 50414 ||  || — || February 26, 2000 || Kitt Peak || Spacewatch || HYG || align=right | 8.6 km || 
|-id=415 bgcolor=#fefefe
| 50415 ||  || — || February 24, 2000 || Višnjan Observatory || K. Korlević, M. Jurić || NYS || align=right | 1.8 km || 
|-id=416 bgcolor=#d6d6d6
| 50416 ||  || — || February 24, 2000 || Oizumi || T. Kobayashi || TEL || align=right | 4.5 km || 
|-id=417 bgcolor=#fefefe
| 50417 ||  || — || February 29, 2000 || Oaxaca || J. M. Roe || NYS || align=right | 1.4 km || 
|-id=418 bgcolor=#E9E9E9
| 50418 ||  || — || February 29, 2000 || Oizumi || T. Kobayashi || — || align=right | 6.6 km || 
|-id=419 bgcolor=#d6d6d6
| 50419 ||  || — || February 29, 2000 || Oizumi || T. Kobayashi || — || align=right | 11 km || 
|-id=420 bgcolor=#fefefe
| 50420 ||  || — || February 29, 2000 || Oizumi || T. Kobayashi || V || align=right | 2.3 km || 
|-id=421 bgcolor=#d6d6d6
| 50421 ||  || — || February 26, 2000 || Kitt Peak || Spacewatch || — || align=right | 6.9 km || 
|-id=422 bgcolor=#d6d6d6
| 50422 ||  || — || February 26, 2000 || Kitt Peak || Spacewatch || HYG || align=right | 6.0 km || 
|-id=423 bgcolor=#fefefe
| 50423 ||  || — || February 27, 2000 || Kitt Peak || Spacewatch || — || align=right | 2.0 km || 
|-id=424 bgcolor=#E9E9E9
| 50424 ||  || — || February 28, 2000 || Kitt Peak || Spacewatch || — || align=right | 2.9 km || 
|-id=425 bgcolor=#fefefe
| 50425 ||  || — || February 28, 2000 || Kitt Peak || Spacewatch || NYS || align=right | 1.2 km || 
|-id=426 bgcolor=#d6d6d6
| 50426 ||  || — || February 26, 2000 || Catalina || CSS || — || align=right | 6.1 km || 
|-id=427 bgcolor=#d6d6d6
| 50427 ||  || — || February 26, 2000 || Catalina || CSS || EOS || align=right | 5.9 km || 
|-id=428 bgcolor=#E9E9E9
| 50428 Alexanderdessler ||  ||  || February 27, 2000 || Catalina || CSS || — || align=right | 3.5 km || 
|-id=429 bgcolor=#E9E9E9
| 50429 ||  || — || February 28, 2000 || Višnjan Observatory || K. Korlević || — || align=right | 4.2 km || 
|-id=430 bgcolor=#E9E9E9
| 50430 ||  || — || February 29, 2000 || Višnjan Observatory || K. Korlević || GEF || align=right | 3.8 km || 
|-id=431 bgcolor=#E9E9E9
| 50431 ||  || — || February 29, 2000 || Socorro || LINEAR || — || align=right | 2.2 km || 
|-id=432 bgcolor=#fefefe
| 50432 ||  || — || February 29, 2000 || Socorro || LINEAR || NYS || align=right | 1.5 km || 
|-id=433 bgcolor=#E9E9E9
| 50433 ||  || — || February 29, 2000 || Socorro || LINEAR || — || align=right | 6.4 km || 
|-id=434 bgcolor=#E9E9E9
| 50434 ||  || — || February 29, 2000 || Socorro || LINEAR || — || align=right | 2.9 km || 
|-id=435 bgcolor=#E9E9E9
| 50435 ||  || — || February 29, 2000 || Socorro || LINEAR || EUN || align=right | 3.0 km || 
|-id=436 bgcolor=#E9E9E9
| 50436 ||  || — || February 29, 2000 || Socorro || LINEAR || HEN || align=right | 3.0 km || 
|-id=437 bgcolor=#E9E9E9
| 50437 ||  || — || February 29, 2000 || Socorro || LINEAR || — || align=right | 6.4 km || 
|-id=438 bgcolor=#E9E9E9
| 50438 ||  || — || February 29, 2000 || Socorro || LINEAR || — || align=right | 2.4 km || 
|-id=439 bgcolor=#E9E9E9
| 50439 ||  || — || February 29, 2000 || Socorro || LINEAR || — || align=right | 3.7 km || 
|-id=440 bgcolor=#E9E9E9
| 50440 ||  || — || February 29, 2000 || Socorro || LINEAR || — || align=right | 4.4 km || 
|-id=441 bgcolor=#E9E9E9
| 50441 ||  || — || February 29, 2000 || Socorro || LINEAR || WIT || align=right | 2.2 km || 
|-id=442 bgcolor=#E9E9E9
| 50442 ||  || — || February 29, 2000 || Socorro || LINEAR || ADE || align=right | 7.0 km || 
|-id=443 bgcolor=#d6d6d6
| 50443 ||  || — || February 29, 2000 || Socorro || LINEAR || EOS || align=right | 3.6 km || 
|-id=444 bgcolor=#E9E9E9
| 50444 ||  || — || February 29, 2000 || Socorro || LINEAR || GEF || align=right | 3.1 km || 
|-id=445 bgcolor=#E9E9E9
| 50445 ||  || — || February 29, 2000 || Socorro || LINEAR || — || align=right | 1.9 km || 
|-id=446 bgcolor=#E9E9E9
| 50446 ||  || — || February 29, 2000 || Socorro || LINEAR || — || align=right | 3.3 km || 
|-id=447 bgcolor=#fefefe
| 50447 ||  || — || February 29, 2000 || Socorro || LINEAR || NYS || align=right | 1.6 km || 
|-id=448 bgcolor=#E9E9E9
| 50448 ||  || — || February 29, 2000 || Socorro || LINEAR || — || align=right | 2.6 km || 
|-id=449 bgcolor=#fefefe
| 50449 ||  || — || February 29, 2000 || Socorro || LINEAR || NYS || align=right | 3.7 km || 
|-id=450 bgcolor=#E9E9E9
| 50450 ||  || — || February 29, 2000 || Socorro || LINEAR || — || align=right | 2.3 km || 
|-id=451 bgcolor=#fefefe
| 50451 ||  || — || February 29, 2000 || Socorro || LINEAR || — || align=right | 1.9 km || 
|-id=452 bgcolor=#d6d6d6
| 50452 ||  || — || February 29, 2000 || Socorro || LINEAR || KOR || align=right | 4.1 km || 
|-id=453 bgcolor=#fefefe
| 50453 ||  || — || February 29, 2000 || Socorro || LINEAR || — || align=right | 2.3 km || 
|-id=454 bgcolor=#fefefe
| 50454 ||  || — || February 29, 2000 || Socorro || LINEAR || MAS || align=right | 1.5 km || 
|-id=455 bgcolor=#E9E9E9
| 50455 ||  || — || February 29, 2000 || Socorro || LINEAR || — || align=right | 7.0 km || 
|-id=456 bgcolor=#E9E9E9
| 50456 ||  || — || February 29, 2000 || Socorro || LINEAR || — || align=right | 3.8 km || 
|-id=457 bgcolor=#E9E9E9
| 50457 ||  || — || February 29, 2000 || Socorro || LINEAR || — || align=right | 3.8 km || 
|-id=458 bgcolor=#d6d6d6
| 50458 ||  || — || February 29, 2000 || Socorro || LINEAR || KOR || align=right | 3.7 km || 
|-id=459 bgcolor=#fefefe
| 50459 ||  || — || February 29, 2000 || Socorro || LINEAR || NYS || align=right | 3.6 km || 
|-id=460 bgcolor=#d6d6d6
| 50460 ||  || — || February 29, 2000 || Socorro || LINEAR || — || align=right | 10 km || 
|-id=461 bgcolor=#d6d6d6
| 50461 ||  || — || February 29, 2000 || Socorro || LINEAR || — || align=right | 9.1 km || 
|-id=462 bgcolor=#d6d6d6
| 50462 ||  || — || February 29, 2000 || Socorro || LINEAR || THM || align=right | 9.5 km || 
|-id=463 bgcolor=#E9E9E9
| 50463 ||  || — || February 29, 2000 || Socorro || LINEAR || — || align=right | 3.6 km || 
|-id=464 bgcolor=#E9E9E9
| 50464 ||  || — || February 29, 2000 || Socorro || LINEAR || — || align=right | 3.3 km || 
|-id=465 bgcolor=#fefefe
| 50465 ||  || — || February 29, 2000 || Socorro || LINEAR || — || align=right | 2.3 km || 
|-id=466 bgcolor=#fefefe
| 50466 ||  || — || February 29, 2000 || Socorro || LINEAR || NYS || align=right | 3.6 km || 
|-id=467 bgcolor=#d6d6d6
| 50467 ||  || — || February 29, 2000 || Socorro || LINEAR || THM || align=right | 7.0 km || 
|-id=468 bgcolor=#E9E9E9
| 50468 ||  || — || February 29, 2000 || Socorro || LINEAR || — || align=right | 4.2 km || 
|-id=469 bgcolor=#fefefe
| 50469 ||  || — || February 29, 2000 || Socorro || LINEAR || NYS || align=right | 1.6 km || 
|-id=470 bgcolor=#fefefe
| 50470 ||  || — || February 29, 2000 || Socorro || LINEAR || — || align=right | 1.7 km || 
|-id=471 bgcolor=#fefefe
| 50471 ||  || — || February 29, 2000 || Socorro || LINEAR || MAS || align=right | 2.0 km || 
|-id=472 bgcolor=#fefefe
| 50472 ||  || — || February 29, 2000 || Socorro || LINEAR || FLO || align=right | 1.8 km || 
|-id=473 bgcolor=#E9E9E9
| 50473 ||  || — || February 29, 2000 || Socorro || LINEAR || — || align=right | 5.6 km || 
|-id=474 bgcolor=#fefefe
| 50474 ||  || — || February 29, 2000 || Socorro || LINEAR || EUT || align=right | 1.9 km || 
|-id=475 bgcolor=#d6d6d6
| 50475 ||  || — || February 29, 2000 || Socorro || LINEAR || KOR || align=right | 4.0 km || 
|-id=476 bgcolor=#E9E9E9
| 50476 ||  || — || February 29, 2000 || Socorro || LINEAR || — || align=right | 2.9 km || 
|-id=477 bgcolor=#E9E9E9
| 50477 ||  || — || February 29, 2000 || Socorro || LINEAR || — || align=right | 5.7 km || 
|-id=478 bgcolor=#E9E9E9
| 50478 ||  || — || February 29, 2000 || Socorro || LINEAR || — || align=right | 3.0 km || 
|-id=479 bgcolor=#E9E9E9
| 50479 ||  || — || February 29, 2000 || Socorro || LINEAR || — || align=right | 7.9 km || 
|-id=480 bgcolor=#E9E9E9
| 50480 ||  || — || February 29, 2000 || Socorro || LINEAR || — || align=right | 4.4 km || 
|-id=481 bgcolor=#E9E9E9
| 50481 ||  || — || February 29, 2000 || Socorro || LINEAR || — || align=right | 4.8 km || 
|-id=482 bgcolor=#E9E9E9
| 50482 ||  || — || February 29, 2000 || Socorro || LINEAR || — || align=right | 6.7 km || 
|-id=483 bgcolor=#E9E9E9
| 50483 ||  || — || February 28, 2000 || Socorro || LINEAR || — || align=right | 3.7 km || 
|-id=484 bgcolor=#fefefe
| 50484 ||  || — || February 28, 2000 || Socorro || LINEAR || — || align=right | 2.5 km || 
|-id=485 bgcolor=#E9E9E9
| 50485 ||  || — || February 28, 2000 || Socorro || LINEAR || NEM || align=right | 5.5 km || 
|-id=486 bgcolor=#fefefe
| 50486 ||  || — || February 29, 2000 || Socorro || LINEAR || — || align=right | 1.7 km || 
|-id=487 bgcolor=#fefefe
| 50487 ||  || — || February 29, 2000 || Socorro || LINEAR || V || align=right | 1.8 km || 
|-id=488 bgcolor=#fefefe
| 50488 ||  || — || February 29, 2000 || Socorro || LINEAR || V || align=right | 2.6 km || 
|-id=489 bgcolor=#fefefe
| 50489 ||  || — || February 29, 2000 || Socorro || LINEAR || V || align=right | 2.0 km || 
|-id=490 bgcolor=#fefefe
| 50490 ||  || — || February 29, 2000 || Socorro || LINEAR || — || align=right | 2.1 km || 
|-id=491 bgcolor=#E9E9E9
| 50491 ||  || — || February 27, 2000 || Kitt Peak || Spacewatch || — || align=right | 5.2 km || 
|-id=492 bgcolor=#fefefe
| 50492 ||  || — || February 28, 2000 || Socorro || LINEAR || NYS || align=right | 1.7 km || 
|-id=493 bgcolor=#d6d6d6
| 50493 ||  || — || February 28, 2000 || Socorro || LINEAR || KOR || align=right | 3.0 km || 
|-id=494 bgcolor=#E9E9E9
| 50494 ||  || — || February 28, 2000 || Socorro || LINEAR || — || align=right | 2.9 km || 
|-id=495 bgcolor=#E9E9E9
| 50495 ||  || — || February 28, 2000 || Socorro || LINEAR || DOR || align=right | 11 km || 
|-id=496 bgcolor=#E9E9E9
| 50496 ||  || — || February 28, 2000 || Socorro || LINEAR || — || align=right | 5.2 km || 
|-id=497 bgcolor=#E9E9E9
| 50497 ||  || — || February 28, 2000 || Socorro || LINEAR || — || align=right | 2.4 km || 
|-id=498 bgcolor=#E9E9E9
| 50498 ||  || — || February 28, 2000 || Socorro || LINEAR || — || align=right | 6.9 km || 
|-id=499 bgcolor=#E9E9E9
| 50499 ||  || — || February 29, 2000 || Socorro || LINEAR || — || align=right | 5.0 km || 
|-id=500 bgcolor=#fefefe
| 50500 ||  || — || February 29, 2000 || Socorro || LINEAR || MAS || align=right | 1.8 km || 
|}

50501–50600 

|-bgcolor=#E9E9E9
| 50501 ||  || — || February 29, 2000 || Socorro || LINEAR || — || align=right | 2.9 km || 
|-id=502 bgcolor=#d6d6d6
| 50502 ||  || — || February 29, 2000 || Socorro || LINEAR || EOS || align=right | 5.1 km || 
|-id=503 bgcolor=#E9E9E9
| 50503 ||  || — || February 29, 2000 || Socorro || LINEAR || WIT || align=right | 2.6 km || 
|-id=504 bgcolor=#E9E9E9
| 50504 ||  || — || February 29, 2000 || Socorro || LINEAR || — || align=right | 3.2 km || 
|-id=505 bgcolor=#E9E9E9
| 50505 ||  || — || February 29, 2000 || Socorro || LINEAR || — || align=right | 5.6 km || 
|-id=506 bgcolor=#fefefe
| 50506 ||  || — || February 29, 2000 || Socorro || LINEAR || — || align=right | 3.6 km || 
|-id=507 bgcolor=#E9E9E9
| 50507 ||  || — || February 29, 2000 || Socorro || LINEAR || MAR || align=right | 4.1 km || 
|-id=508 bgcolor=#d6d6d6
| 50508 ||  || — || February 29, 2000 || Socorro || LINEAR || — || align=right | 6.4 km || 
|-id=509 bgcolor=#fefefe
| 50509 ||  || — || February 29, 2000 || Socorro || LINEAR || FLO || align=right | 1.8 km || 
|-id=510 bgcolor=#d6d6d6
| 50510 ||  || — || February 29, 2000 || Socorro || LINEAR || EOS || align=right | 7.2 km || 
|-id=511 bgcolor=#E9E9E9
| 50511 ||  || — || February 29, 2000 || Socorro || LINEAR || — || align=right | 3.7 km || 
|-id=512 bgcolor=#fefefe
| 50512 ||  || — || February 29, 2000 || Socorro || LINEAR || — || align=right | 2.4 km || 
|-id=513 bgcolor=#E9E9E9
| 50513 ||  || — || February 29, 2000 || Socorro || LINEAR || — || align=right | 4.4 km || 
|-id=514 bgcolor=#E9E9E9
| 50514 ||  || — || February 29, 2000 || Socorro || LINEAR || — || align=right | 3.3 km || 
|-id=515 bgcolor=#fefefe
| 50515 ||  || — || February 29, 2000 || Socorro || LINEAR || — || align=right | 2.9 km || 
|-id=516 bgcolor=#E9E9E9
| 50516 ||  || — || February 29, 2000 || Socorro || LINEAR || — || align=right | 2.9 km || 
|-id=517 bgcolor=#fefefe
| 50517 ||  || — || February 29, 2000 || Socorro || LINEAR || — || align=right | 2.7 km || 
|-id=518 bgcolor=#fefefe
| 50518 ||  || — || February 29, 2000 || Socorro || LINEAR || — || align=right | 1.4 km || 
|-id=519 bgcolor=#E9E9E9
| 50519 ||  || — || February 29, 2000 || Socorro || LINEAR || HNS || align=right | 3.6 km || 
|-id=520 bgcolor=#fefefe
| 50520 ||  || — || February 28, 2000 || Socorro || LINEAR || FLO || align=right | 3.7 km || 
|-id=521 bgcolor=#E9E9E9
| 50521 ||  || — || February 29, 2000 || Socorro || LINEAR || HEN || align=right | 2.4 km || 
|-id=522 bgcolor=#E9E9E9
| 50522 ||  || — || February 29, 2000 || Socorro || LINEAR || — || align=right | 2.7 km || 
|-id=523 bgcolor=#E9E9E9
| 50523 ||  || — || February 27, 2000 || Catalina || CSS || — || align=right | 4.6 km || 
|-id=524 bgcolor=#E9E9E9
| 50524 ||  || — || February 27, 2000 || Catalina || CSS || — || align=right | 2.6 km || 
|-id=525 bgcolor=#E9E9E9
| 50525 ||  || — || March 3, 2000 || Socorro || LINEAR || — || align=right | 2.5 km || 
|-id=526 bgcolor=#fefefe
| 50526 ||  || — || March 2, 2000 || Kitt Peak || Spacewatch || NYS || align=right | 1.1 km || 
|-id=527 bgcolor=#E9E9E9
| 50527 ||  || — || March 2, 2000 || Kitt Peak || Spacewatch || ADE || align=right | 3.7 km || 
|-id=528 bgcolor=#E9E9E9
| 50528 ||  || — || March 3, 2000 || Socorro || LINEAR || EUN || align=right | 3.6 km || 
|-id=529 bgcolor=#E9E9E9
| 50529 ||  || — || March 3, 2000 || Socorro || LINEAR || — || align=right | 4.3 km || 
|-id=530 bgcolor=#E9E9E9
| 50530 ||  || — || March 3, 2000 || Socorro || LINEAR || — || align=right | 3.5 km || 
|-id=531 bgcolor=#E9E9E9
| 50531 ||  || — || March 4, 2000 || Socorro || LINEAR || — || align=right | 7.2 km || 
|-id=532 bgcolor=#d6d6d6
| 50532 ||  || — || March 4, 2000 || Socorro || LINEAR || — || align=right | 12 km || 
|-id=533 bgcolor=#d6d6d6
| 50533 ||  || — || March 4, 2000 || Socorro || LINEAR || EMA || align=right | 11 km || 
|-id=534 bgcolor=#E9E9E9
| 50534 ||  || — || March 4, 2000 || Socorro || LINEAR || GEF || align=right | 4.6 km || 
|-id=535 bgcolor=#E9E9E9
| 50535 ||  || — || March 4, 2000 || Socorro || LINEAR || — || align=right | 5.6 km || 
|-id=536 bgcolor=#fefefe
| 50536 ||  || — || March 5, 2000 || Socorro || LINEAR || — || align=right | 1.9 km || 
|-id=537 bgcolor=#fefefe
| 50537 ||  || — || March 3, 2000 || San Marcello || M. Tombelli, L. Tesi || — || align=right | 2.0 km || 
|-id=538 bgcolor=#d6d6d6
| 50538 ||  || — || March 3, 2000 || Višnjan Observatory || K. Korlević || TEL || align=right | 3.9 km || 
|-id=539 bgcolor=#fefefe
| 50539 ||  || — || March 6, 2000 || Farra d'Isonzo || Farra d'Isonzo || — || align=right | 3.4 km || 
|-id=540 bgcolor=#fefefe
| 50540 ||  || — || March 3, 2000 || Socorro || LINEAR || FLO || align=right | 1.6 km || 
|-id=541 bgcolor=#d6d6d6
| 50541 ||  || — || March 3, 2000 || Socorro || LINEAR || — || align=right | 4.8 km || 
|-id=542 bgcolor=#d6d6d6
| 50542 ||  || — || March 3, 2000 || Socorro || LINEAR || EOS || align=right | 6.8 km || 
|-id=543 bgcolor=#E9E9E9
| 50543 ||  || — || March 3, 2000 || Socorro || LINEAR || — || align=right | 6.5 km || 
|-id=544 bgcolor=#fefefe
| 50544 ||  || — || March 4, 2000 || Socorro || LINEAR || — || align=right | 2.4 km || 
|-id=545 bgcolor=#E9E9E9
| 50545 ||  || — || March 4, 2000 || Socorro || LINEAR || — || align=right | 5.4 km || 
|-id=546 bgcolor=#E9E9E9
| 50546 ||  || — || March 4, 2000 || Socorro || LINEAR || — || align=right | 4.4 km || 
|-id=547 bgcolor=#fefefe
| 50547 ||  || — || March 5, 2000 || Socorro || LINEAR || NYS || align=right | 4.3 km || 
|-id=548 bgcolor=#fefefe
| 50548 ||  || — || March 5, 2000 || Socorro || LINEAR || MAS || align=right | 2.1 km || 
|-id=549 bgcolor=#E9E9E9
| 50549 ||  || — || March 6, 2000 || Socorro || LINEAR || KON || align=right | 6.3 km || 
|-id=550 bgcolor=#d6d6d6
| 50550 ||  || — || March 7, 2000 || Socorro || LINEAR || EOS || align=right | 8.0 km || 
|-id=551 bgcolor=#d6d6d6
| 50551 ||  || — || March 3, 2000 || Catalina || CSS || — || align=right | 10 km || 
|-id=552 bgcolor=#E9E9E9
| 50552 ||  || — || March 3, 2000 || Catalina || CSS || — || align=right | 7.2 km || 
|-id=553 bgcolor=#E9E9E9
| 50553 ||  || — || March 3, 2000 || Catalina || CSS || — || align=right | 3.0 km || 
|-id=554 bgcolor=#d6d6d6
| 50554 ||  || — || March 8, 2000 || Kitt Peak || Spacewatch || slow || align=right | 5.7 km || 
|-id=555 bgcolor=#d6d6d6
| 50555 ||  || — || March 8, 2000 || Kitt Peak || Spacewatch || — || align=right | 4.1 km || 
|-id=556 bgcolor=#E9E9E9
| 50556 ||  || — || March 8, 2000 || Kitt Peak || Spacewatch || — || align=right | 6.2 km || 
|-id=557 bgcolor=#fefefe
| 50557 ||  || — || March 8, 2000 || Kitt Peak || Spacewatch || MAS || align=right | 2.0 km || 
|-id=558 bgcolor=#fefefe
| 50558 ||  || — || March 4, 2000 || Uccle || E. W. Elst, D. Taeymans || — || align=right | 3.5 km || 
|-id=559 bgcolor=#E9E9E9
| 50559 ||  || — || March 3, 2000 || Socorro || LINEAR || — || align=right | 2.2 km || 
|-id=560 bgcolor=#E9E9E9
| 50560 ||  || — || March 4, 2000 || Socorro || LINEAR || — || align=right | 6.9 km || 
|-id=561 bgcolor=#E9E9E9
| 50561 ||  || — || March 5, 2000 || Socorro || LINEAR || — || align=right | 3.1 km || 
|-id=562 bgcolor=#fefefe
| 50562 ||  || — || March 5, 2000 || Socorro || LINEAR || V || align=right | 2.8 km || 
|-id=563 bgcolor=#fefefe
| 50563 ||  || — || March 5, 2000 || Socorro || LINEAR || V || align=right | 2.3 km || 
|-id=564 bgcolor=#E9E9E9
| 50564 ||  || — || March 8, 2000 || Socorro || LINEAR || HEN || align=right | 4.2 km || 
|-id=565 bgcolor=#d6d6d6
| 50565 ||  || — || March 8, 2000 || Socorro || LINEAR || KOR || align=right | 3.6 km || 
|-id=566 bgcolor=#d6d6d6
| 50566 ||  || — || March 8, 2000 || Socorro || LINEAR || EOS || align=right | 7.2 km || 
|-id=567 bgcolor=#E9E9E9
| 50567 ||  || — || March 8, 2000 || Socorro || LINEAR || — || align=right | 7.4 km || 
|-id=568 bgcolor=#E9E9E9
| 50568 ||  || — || March 8, 2000 || Socorro || LINEAR || — || align=right | 3.2 km || 
|-id=569 bgcolor=#d6d6d6
| 50569 ||  || — || March 8, 2000 || Socorro || LINEAR || NAE || align=right | 8.7 km || 
|-id=570 bgcolor=#fefefe
| 50570 ||  || — || March 8, 2000 || Socorro || LINEAR || NYS || align=right | 1.4 km || 
|-id=571 bgcolor=#d6d6d6
| 50571 ||  || — || March 8, 2000 || Socorro || LINEAR || — || align=right | 2.9 km || 
|-id=572 bgcolor=#E9E9E9
| 50572 ||  || — || March 8, 2000 || Socorro || LINEAR || AGN || align=right | 5.2 km || 
|-id=573 bgcolor=#E9E9E9
| 50573 ||  || — || March 8, 2000 || Socorro || LINEAR || — || align=right | 3.5 km || 
|-id=574 bgcolor=#d6d6d6
| 50574 ||  || — || March 8, 2000 || Socorro || LINEAR || 628 || align=right | 5.6 km || 
|-id=575 bgcolor=#fefefe
| 50575 ||  || — || March 8, 2000 || Socorro || LINEAR || — || align=right | 3.6 km || 
|-id=576 bgcolor=#d6d6d6
| 50576 ||  || — || March 8, 2000 || Socorro || LINEAR || — || align=right | 5.3 km || 
|-id=577 bgcolor=#d6d6d6
| 50577 ||  || — || March 8, 2000 || Socorro || LINEAR || THM || align=right | 5.3 km || 
|-id=578 bgcolor=#fefefe
| 50578 ||  || — || March 8, 2000 || Socorro || LINEAR || NYS || align=right | 2.1 km || 
|-id=579 bgcolor=#E9E9E9
| 50579 ||  || — || March 8, 2000 || Socorro || LINEAR || — || align=right | 2.7 km || 
|-id=580 bgcolor=#E9E9E9
| 50580 ||  || — || March 8, 2000 || Socorro || LINEAR || — || align=right | 4.4 km || 
|-id=581 bgcolor=#E9E9E9
| 50581 ||  || — || March 8, 2000 || Socorro || LINEAR || — || align=right | 5.7 km || 
|-id=582 bgcolor=#d6d6d6
| 50582 ||  || — || March 8, 2000 || Socorro || LINEAR || HYG || align=right | 7.1 km || 
|-id=583 bgcolor=#E9E9E9
| 50583 ||  || — || March 8, 2000 || Socorro || LINEAR || PAD || align=right | 5.9 km || 
|-id=584 bgcolor=#d6d6d6
| 50584 ||  || — || March 8, 2000 || Socorro || LINEAR || — || align=right | 7.3 km || 
|-id=585 bgcolor=#fefefe
| 50585 ||  || — || March 8, 2000 || Socorro || LINEAR || NYS || align=right | 1.4 km || 
|-id=586 bgcolor=#fefefe
| 50586 ||  || — || March 8, 2000 || Socorro || LINEAR || — || align=right | 2.0 km || 
|-id=587 bgcolor=#d6d6d6
| 50587 ||  || — || March 9, 2000 || Socorro || LINEAR || KOR || align=right | 6.0 km || 
|-id=588 bgcolor=#E9E9E9
| 50588 ||  || — || March 9, 2000 || Socorro || LINEAR || — || align=right | 3.0 km || 
|-id=589 bgcolor=#d6d6d6
| 50589 ||  || — || March 9, 2000 || Socorro || LINEAR || — || align=right | 5.6 km || 
|-id=590 bgcolor=#E9E9E9
| 50590 ||  || — || March 9, 2000 || Socorro || LINEAR || — || align=right | 2.4 km || 
|-id=591 bgcolor=#fefefe
| 50591 ||  || — || March 9, 2000 || Socorro || LINEAR || NYS || align=right | 2.1 km || 
|-id=592 bgcolor=#fefefe
| 50592 ||  || — || March 9, 2000 || Socorro || LINEAR || — || align=right | 3.1 km || 
|-id=593 bgcolor=#fefefe
| 50593 ||  || — || March 9, 2000 || Socorro || LINEAR || — || align=right | 2.1 km || 
|-id=594 bgcolor=#d6d6d6
| 50594 ||  || — || March 9, 2000 || Socorro || LINEAR || KOR || align=right | 3.5 km || 
|-id=595 bgcolor=#E9E9E9
| 50595 ||  || — || March 9, 2000 || Socorro || LINEAR || — || align=right | 2.6 km || 
|-id=596 bgcolor=#d6d6d6
| 50596 ||  || — || March 9, 2000 || Socorro || LINEAR || — || align=right | 5.8 km || 
|-id=597 bgcolor=#fefefe
| 50597 ||  || — || March 9, 2000 || Socorro || LINEAR || — || align=right | 4.3 km || 
|-id=598 bgcolor=#E9E9E9
| 50598 ||  || — || March 9, 2000 || Socorro || LINEAR || — || align=right | 4.2 km || 
|-id=599 bgcolor=#E9E9E9
| 50599 ||  || — || March 9, 2000 || Socorro || LINEAR || HOF || align=right | 7.0 km || 
|-id=600 bgcolor=#E9E9E9
| 50600 ||  || — || March 9, 2000 || Socorro || LINEAR || PAD || align=right | 5.6 km || 
|}

50601–50700 

|-bgcolor=#E9E9E9
| 50601 ||  || — || March 6, 2000 || Višnjan Observatory || K. Korlević || — || align=right | 4.2 km || 
|-id=602 bgcolor=#fefefe
| 50602 ||  || — || March 10, 2000 || Prescott || P. G. Comba || V || align=right | 2.5 km || 
|-id=603 bgcolor=#E9E9E9
| 50603 ||  || — || March 9, 2000 || Kitt Peak || Spacewatch || — || align=right | 5.7 km || 
|-id=604 bgcolor=#d6d6d6
| 50604 ||  || — || March 10, 2000 || Kitt Peak || Spacewatch || MEL || align=right | 10 km || 
|-id=605 bgcolor=#d6d6d6
| 50605 ||  || — || March 10, 2000 || Kitt Peak || Spacewatch || CHA || align=right | 6.3 km || 
|-id=606 bgcolor=#E9E9E9
| 50606 ||  || — || March 5, 2000 || Socorro || LINEAR || — || align=right | 5.2 km || 
|-id=607 bgcolor=#E9E9E9
| 50607 ||  || — || March 8, 2000 || Socorro || LINEAR || DOR || align=right | 11 km || 
|-id=608 bgcolor=#E9E9E9
| 50608 ||  || — || March 8, 2000 || Socorro || LINEAR || EUN || align=right | 3.9 km || 
|-id=609 bgcolor=#E9E9E9
| 50609 ||  || — || March 8, 2000 || Socorro || LINEAR || PAD || align=right | 8.8 km || 
|-id=610 bgcolor=#d6d6d6
| 50610 ||  || — || March 8, 2000 || Socorro || LINEAR || — || align=right | 9.7 km || 
|-id=611 bgcolor=#fefefe
| 50611 ||  || — || March 8, 2000 || Socorro || LINEAR || MAS || align=right | 2.1 km || 
|-id=612 bgcolor=#E9E9E9
| 50612 ||  || — || March 8, 2000 || Socorro || LINEAR || WIT || align=right | 2.7 km || 
|-id=613 bgcolor=#E9E9E9
| 50613 ||  || — || March 8, 2000 || Socorro || LINEAR || PAD || align=right | 6.3 km || 
|-id=614 bgcolor=#E9E9E9
| 50614 ||  || — || March 9, 2000 || Socorro || LINEAR || — || align=right | 3.3 km || 
|-id=615 bgcolor=#d6d6d6
| 50615 ||  || — || March 10, 2000 || Socorro || LINEAR || EOS || align=right | 5.1 km || 
|-id=616 bgcolor=#E9E9E9
| 50616 ||  || — || March 10, 2000 || Socorro || LINEAR || — || align=right | 2.9 km || 
|-id=617 bgcolor=#d6d6d6
| 50617 ||  || — || March 10, 2000 || Socorro || LINEAR || — || align=right | 7.4 km || 
|-id=618 bgcolor=#E9E9E9
| 50618 ||  || — || March 10, 2000 || Socorro || LINEAR || — || align=right | 2.9 km || 
|-id=619 bgcolor=#d6d6d6
| 50619 ||  || — || March 10, 2000 || Socorro || LINEAR || KOR || align=right | 4.9 km || 
|-id=620 bgcolor=#E9E9E9
| 50620 ||  || — || March 10, 2000 || Socorro || LINEAR || — || align=right | 6.2 km || 
|-id=621 bgcolor=#E9E9E9
| 50621 ||  || — || March 10, 2000 || Socorro || LINEAR || — || align=right | 5.9 km || 
|-id=622 bgcolor=#E9E9E9
| 50622 ||  || — || March 10, 2000 || Socorro || LINEAR || EUN || align=right | 5.0 km || 
|-id=623 bgcolor=#d6d6d6
| 50623 ||  || — || March 10, 2000 || Socorro || LINEAR || KOR || align=right | 4.4 km || 
|-id=624 bgcolor=#d6d6d6
| 50624 ||  || — || March 10, 2000 || Socorro || LINEAR || — || align=right | 3.2 km || 
|-id=625 bgcolor=#d6d6d6
| 50625 ||  || — || March 10, 2000 || Socorro || LINEAR || THM || align=right | 8.9 km || 
|-id=626 bgcolor=#fefefe
| 50626 ||  || — || March 10, 2000 || Socorro || LINEAR || V || align=right | 2.0 km || 
|-id=627 bgcolor=#E9E9E9
| 50627 ||  || — || March 10, 2000 || Socorro || LINEAR || — || align=right | 2.0 km || 
|-id=628 bgcolor=#d6d6d6
| 50628 ||  || — || March 10, 2000 || Socorro || LINEAR || THM || align=right | 7.2 km || 
|-id=629 bgcolor=#d6d6d6
| 50629 ||  || — || March 10, 2000 || Socorro || LINEAR || KOR || align=right | 3.6 km || 
|-id=630 bgcolor=#d6d6d6
| 50630 ||  || — || March 10, 2000 || Socorro || LINEAR || — || align=right | 9.1 km || 
|-id=631 bgcolor=#fefefe
| 50631 ||  || — || March 9, 2000 || Kitt Peak || Spacewatch || NYS || align=right | 1.4 km || 
|-id=632 bgcolor=#d6d6d6
| 50632 ||  || — || March 10, 2000 || Kitt Peak || Spacewatch || — || align=right | 3.7 km || 
|-id=633 bgcolor=#E9E9E9
| 50633 ||  || — || March 11, 2000 || Kitt Peak || Spacewatch || — || align=right | 3.6 km || 
|-id=634 bgcolor=#fefefe
| 50634 ||  || — || March 4, 2000 || Socorro || LINEAR || PHO || align=right | 3.5 km || 
|-id=635 bgcolor=#fefefe
| 50635 ||  || — || March 5, 2000 || Socorro || LINEAR || V || align=right | 1.5 km || 
|-id=636 bgcolor=#E9E9E9
| 50636 ||  || — || March 5, 2000 || Socorro || LINEAR || — || align=right | 3.9 km || 
|-id=637 bgcolor=#E9E9E9
| 50637 ||  || — || March 5, 2000 || Socorro || LINEAR || — || align=right | 4.6 km || 
|-id=638 bgcolor=#d6d6d6
| 50638 ||  || — || March 5, 2000 || Socorro || LINEAR || KOR || align=right | 3.2 km || 
|-id=639 bgcolor=#d6d6d6
| 50639 ||  || — || March 5, 2000 || Socorro || LINEAR || — || align=right | 9.1 km || 
|-id=640 bgcolor=#fefefe
| 50640 ||  || — || March 5, 2000 || Socorro || LINEAR || FLO || align=right | 1.8 km || 
|-id=641 bgcolor=#E9E9E9
| 50641 ||  || — || March 6, 2000 || Socorro || LINEAR || — || align=right | 4.6 km || 
|-id=642 bgcolor=#E9E9E9
| 50642 ||  || — || March 8, 2000 || Socorro || LINEAR || — || align=right | 3.6 km || 
|-id=643 bgcolor=#fefefe
| 50643 ||  || — || March 8, 2000 || Socorro || LINEAR || — || align=right | 2.4 km || 
|-id=644 bgcolor=#fefefe
| 50644 ||  || — || March 8, 2000 || Socorro || LINEAR || NYS || align=right | 1.9 km || 
|-id=645 bgcolor=#E9E9E9
| 50645 ||  || — || March 8, 2000 || Socorro || LINEAR || — || align=right | 11 km || 
|-id=646 bgcolor=#E9E9E9
| 50646 ||  || — || March 9, 2000 || Socorro || LINEAR || — || align=right | 3.5 km || 
|-id=647 bgcolor=#d6d6d6
| 50647 ||  || — || March 9, 2000 || Socorro || LINEAR || slow || align=right | 6.0 km || 
|-id=648 bgcolor=#d6d6d6
| 50648 ||  || — || March 9, 2000 || Socorro || LINEAR || KOR || align=right | 4.1 km || 
|-id=649 bgcolor=#E9E9E9
| 50649 ||  || — || March 9, 2000 || Socorro || LINEAR || GEF || align=right | 4.9 km || 
|-id=650 bgcolor=#fefefe
| 50650 ||  || — || March 9, 2000 || Socorro || LINEAR || V || align=right | 2.0 km || 
|-id=651 bgcolor=#E9E9E9
| 50651 ||  || — || March 9, 2000 || Socorro || LINEAR || — || align=right | 6.1 km || 
|-id=652 bgcolor=#d6d6d6
| 50652 ||  || — || March 9, 2000 || Socorro || LINEAR || — || align=right | 5.8 km || 
|-id=653 bgcolor=#E9E9E9
| 50653 ||  || — || March 9, 2000 || Socorro || LINEAR || — || align=right | 5.7 km || 
|-id=654 bgcolor=#E9E9E9
| 50654 ||  || — || March 9, 2000 || Socorro || LINEAR || — || align=right | 6.8 km || 
|-id=655 bgcolor=#E9E9E9
| 50655 ||  || — || March 9, 2000 || Socorro || LINEAR || EUN || align=right | 4.9 km || 
|-id=656 bgcolor=#E9E9E9
| 50656 ||  || — || March 9, 2000 || Socorro || LINEAR || — || align=right | 4.0 km || 
|-id=657 bgcolor=#E9E9E9
| 50657 ||  || — || March 9, 2000 || Socorro || LINEAR || — || align=right | 7.0 km || 
|-id=658 bgcolor=#E9E9E9
| 50658 ||  || — || March 9, 2000 || Socorro || LINEAR || — || align=right | 3.0 km || 
|-id=659 bgcolor=#E9E9E9
| 50659 ||  || — || March 9, 2000 || Socorro || LINEAR || GEF || align=right | 3.9 km || 
|-id=660 bgcolor=#d6d6d6
| 50660 ||  || — || March 9, 2000 || Socorro || LINEAR || — || align=right | 6.3 km || 
|-id=661 bgcolor=#d6d6d6
| 50661 ||  || — || March 10, 2000 || Socorro || LINEAR || LIX || align=right | 11 km || 
|-id=662 bgcolor=#E9E9E9
| 50662 ||  || — || March 10, 2000 || Socorro || LINEAR || — || align=right | 3.8 km || 
|-id=663 bgcolor=#E9E9E9
| 50663 ||  || — || March 8, 2000 || Socorro || LINEAR || — || align=right | 3.3 km || 
|-id=664 bgcolor=#fefefe
| 50664 ||  || — || March 14, 2000 || Socorro || LINEAR || — || align=right | 6.2 km || 
|-id=665 bgcolor=#d6d6d6
| 50665 ||  || — || March 14, 2000 || Višnjan Observatory || K. Korlević || — || align=right | 12 km || 
|-id=666 bgcolor=#fefefe
| 50666 ||  || — || March 13, 2000 || Socorro || LINEAR || — || align=right | 4.2 km || 
|-id=667 bgcolor=#fefefe
| 50667 ||  || — || March 13, 2000 || Socorro || LINEAR || FLO || align=right | 3.3 km || 
|-id=668 bgcolor=#d6d6d6
| 50668 ||  || — || March 11, 2000 || Anderson Mesa || LONEOS || EOS || align=right | 7.9 km || 
|-id=669 bgcolor=#fefefe
| 50669 ||  || — || March 11, 2000 || Anderson Mesa || LONEOS || — || align=right | 3.0 km || 
|-id=670 bgcolor=#fefefe
| 50670 ||  || — || March 11, 2000 || Anderson Mesa || LONEOS || V || align=right | 1.9 km || 
|-id=671 bgcolor=#E9E9E9
| 50671 ||  || — || March 8, 2000 || Socorro || LINEAR || — || align=right | 4.5 km || 
|-id=672 bgcolor=#E9E9E9
| 50672 ||  || — || March 8, 2000 || Socorro || LINEAR || RAF || align=right | 4.0 km || 
|-id=673 bgcolor=#E9E9E9
| 50673 ||  || — || March 8, 2000 || Socorro || LINEAR || — || align=right | 5.3 km || 
|-id=674 bgcolor=#E9E9E9
| 50674 ||  || — || March 8, 2000 || Socorro || LINEAR || — || align=right | 5.4 km || 
|-id=675 bgcolor=#fefefe
| 50675 ||  || — || March 8, 2000 || Socorro || LINEAR || — || align=right | 5.0 km || 
|-id=676 bgcolor=#d6d6d6
| 50676 ||  || — || March 8, 2000 || Haleakala || NEAT || EOS || align=right | 5.8 km || 
|-id=677 bgcolor=#d6d6d6
| 50677 ||  || — || March 8, 2000 || Socorro || LINEAR || — || align=right | 6.3 km || 
|-id=678 bgcolor=#E9E9E9
| 50678 ||  || — || March 8, 2000 || Haleakala || NEAT || GEF || align=right | 3.1 km || 
|-id=679 bgcolor=#E9E9E9
| 50679 ||  || — || March 8, 2000 || Haleakala || NEAT || — || align=right | 2.8 km || 
|-id=680 bgcolor=#E9E9E9
| 50680 ||  || — || March 8, 2000 || Haleakala || NEAT || ADE || align=right | 5.3 km || 
|-id=681 bgcolor=#E9E9E9
| 50681 ||  || — || March 8, 2000 || Haleakala || NEAT || DOR || align=right | 8.8 km || 
|-id=682 bgcolor=#d6d6d6
| 50682 ||  || — || March 8, 2000 || Haleakala || NEAT || — || align=right | 11 km || 
|-id=683 bgcolor=#E9E9E9
| 50683 ||  || — || March 8, 2000 || Haleakala || NEAT || — || align=right | 4.4 km || 
|-id=684 bgcolor=#E9E9E9
| 50684 ||  || — || March 8, 2000 || Haleakala || NEAT || WAT || align=right | 12 km || 
|-id=685 bgcolor=#d6d6d6
| 50685 ||  || — || March 9, 2000 || Socorro || LINEAR || — || align=right | 5.6 km || 
|-id=686 bgcolor=#fefefe
| 50686 ||  || — || March 9, 2000 || Socorro || LINEAR || — || align=right | 8.5 km || 
|-id=687 bgcolor=#E9E9E9
| 50687 Paultemple ||  ||  || March 10, 2000 || Catalina || R. Hill || — || align=right | 4.9 km || 
|-id=688 bgcolor=#E9E9E9
| 50688 ||  || — || March 11, 2000 || Anderson Mesa || LONEOS || — || align=right | 4.5 km || 
|-id=689 bgcolor=#E9E9E9
| 50689 ||  || — || March 11, 2000 || Anderson Mesa || LONEOS || — || align=right | 6.5 km || 
|-id=690 bgcolor=#E9E9E9
| 50690 ||  || — || March 11, 2000 || Anderson Mesa || LONEOS || — || align=right | 3.6 km || 
|-id=691 bgcolor=#E9E9E9
| 50691 ||  || — || March 11, 2000 || Socorro || LINEAR || — || align=right | 3.7 km || 
|-id=692 bgcolor=#d6d6d6
| 50692 ||  || — || March 11, 2000 || Socorro || LINEAR || — || align=right | 4.2 km || 
|-id=693 bgcolor=#d6d6d6
| 50693 ||  || — || March 11, 2000 || Socorro || LINEAR || — || align=right | 6.2 km || 
|-id=694 bgcolor=#E9E9E9
| 50694 ||  || — || March 11, 2000 || Anderson Mesa || LONEOS || — || align=right | 7.0 km || 
|-id=695 bgcolor=#E9E9E9
| 50695 ||  || — || March 11, 2000 || Anderson Mesa || LONEOS || — || align=right | 4.0 km || 
|-id=696 bgcolor=#d6d6d6
| 50696 ||  || — || March 11, 2000 || Anderson Mesa || LONEOS || — || align=right | 9.8 km || 
|-id=697 bgcolor=#fefefe
| 50697 ||  || — || March 11, 2000 || Anderson Mesa || LONEOS || NYS || align=right | 1.6 km || 
|-id=698 bgcolor=#d6d6d6
| 50698 ||  || — || March 11, 2000 || Anderson Mesa || LONEOS || — || align=right | 4.7 km || 
|-id=699 bgcolor=#E9E9E9
| 50699 ||  || — || March 11, 2000 || Anderson Mesa || LONEOS || HEN || align=right | 2.8 km || 
|-id=700 bgcolor=#fefefe
| 50700 ||  || — || March 11, 2000 || Anderson Mesa || LONEOS || NYS || align=right | 1.7 km || 
|}

50701–50800 

|-bgcolor=#d6d6d6
| 50701 ||  || — || March 11, 2000 || Anderson Mesa || LONEOS || EOS || align=right | 5.6 km || 
|-id=702 bgcolor=#d6d6d6
| 50702 ||  || — || March 11, 2000 || Anderson Mesa || LONEOS || KOR || align=right | 7.4 km || 
|-id=703 bgcolor=#d6d6d6
| 50703 ||  || — || March 11, 2000 || Anderson Mesa || LONEOS || THM || align=right | 11 km || 
|-id=704 bgcolor=#fefefe
| 50704 ||  || — || March 11, 2000 || Socorro || LINEAR || V || align=right | 2.6 km || 
|-id=705 bgcolor=#E9E9E9
| 50705 ||  || — || March 11, 2000 || Socorro || LINEAR || — || align=right | 3.8 km || 
|-id=706 bgcolor=#fefefe
| 50706 ||  || — || March 11, 2000 || Socorro || LINEAR || — || align=right | 3.5 km || 
|-id=707 bgcolor=#fefefe
| 50707 ||  || — || March 11, 2000 || Socorro || LINEAR || — || align=right | 1.5 km || 
|-id=708 bgcolor=#E9E9E9
| 50708 ||  || — || March 11, 2000 || Socorro || LINEAR || — || align=right | 2.3 km || 
|-id=709 bgcolor=#fefefe
| 50709 ||  || — || March 11, 2000 || Socorro || LINEAR || NYS || align=right | 1.7 km || 
|-id=710 bgcolor=#d6d6d6
| 50710 ||  || — || March 11, 2000 || Anderson Mesa || LONEOS || EOS || align=right | 5.5 km || 
|-id=711 bgcolor=#E9E9E9
| 50711 ||  || — || March 11, 2000 || Anderson Mesa || LONEOS || — || align=right | 3.1 km || 
|-id=712 bgcolor=#d6d6d6
| 50712 ||  || — || March 11, 2000 || Anderson Mesa || LONEOS || — || align=right | 7.3 km || 
|-id=713 bgcolor=#fefefe
| 50713 ||  || — || March 11, 2000 || Anderson Mesa || LONEOS || PHO || align=right | 4.1 km || 
|-id=714 bgcolor=#E9E9E9
| 50714 ||  || — || March 12, 2000 || Socorro || LINEAR || — || align=right | 2.6 km || 
|-id=715 bgcolor=#d6d6d6
| 50715 ||  || — || March 12, 2000 || Socorro || LINEAR || KAR || align=right | 3.4 km || 
|-id=716 bgcolor=#d6d6d6
| 50716 ||  || — || March 12, 2000 || Socorro || LINEAR || HYG || align=right | 7.9 km || 
|-id=717 bgcolor=#E9E9E9
| 50717 Jimfox ||  ||  || March 11, 2000 || Catalina || CSS || — || align=right | 12 km || 
|-id=718 bgcolor=#E9E9E9
| 50718 Timrobertson ||  ||  || March 11, 2000 || Catalina || CSS || EUN || align=right | 4.0 km || 
|-id=719 bgcolor=#E9E9E9
| 50719 Elizabethgriffin ||  ||  || March 1, 2000 || Catalina || CSS || MARslow || align=right | 3.3 km || 
|-id=720 bgcolor=#E9E9E9
| 50720 ||  || — || March 2, 2000 || Kitt Peak || Spacewatch || HEN || align=right | 2.4 km || 
|-id=721 bgcolor=#fefefe
| 50721 Waynebailey ||  ||  || March 2, 2000 || Catalina || CSS || — || align=right | 3.6 km || 
|-id=722 bgcolor=#d6d6d6
| 50722 Sherlin ||  ||  || March 2, 2000 || Catalina || CSS || — || align=right | 7.6 km || 
|-id=723 bgcolor=#E9E9E9
| 50723 Beckley ||  ||  || March 3, 2000 || Catalina || CSS || — || align=right | 2.7 km || 
|-id=724 bgcolor=#E9E9E9
| 50724 ||  || — || March 3, 2000 || Catalina || CSS || — || align=right | 2.9 km || 
|-id=725 bgcolor=#E9E9E9
| 50725 ||  || — || March 4, 2000 || Catalina || CSS || — || align=right | 3.0 km || 
|-id=726 bgcolor=#E9E9E9
| 50726 ||  || — || March 4, 2000 || Catalina || CSS || — || align=right | 6.4 km || 
|-id=727 bgcolor=#d6d6d6
| 50727 ||  || — || March 4, 2000 || Catalina || CSS || — || align=right | 5.3 km || 
|-id=728 bgcolor=#d6d6d6
| 50728 ||  || — || March 4, 2000 || Catalina || CSS || — || align=right | 7.3 km || 
|-id=729 bgcolor=#fefefe
| 50729 ||  || — || March 4, 2000 || Catalina || CSS || NYS || align=right | 2.3 km || 
|-id=730 bgcolor=#E9E9E9
| 50730 ||  || — || March 5, 2000 || Socorro || LINEAR || EUN || align=right | 4.1 km || 
|-id=731 bgcolor=#E9E9E9
| 50731 ||  || — || March 5, 2000 || Socorro || LINEAR || EUN || align=right | 5.4 km || 
|-id=732 bgcolor=#E9E9E9
| 50732 ||  || — || March 5, 2000 || Haleakala || NEAT || EUN || align=right | 3.3 km || 
|-id=733 bgcolor=#fefefe
| 50733 ||  || — || March 6, 2000 || Haleakala || NEAT || — || align=right | 1.9 km || 
|-id=734 bgcolor=#E9E9E9
| 50734 ||  || — || March 6, 2000 || Haleakala || NEAT || MAR || align=right | 3.1 km || 
|-id=735 bgcolor=#E9E9E9
| 50735 ||  || — || March 6, 2000 || Haleakala || NEAT || — || align=right | 4.2 km || 
|-id=736 bgcolor=#E9E9E9
| 50736 ||  || — || March 6, 2000 || Haleakala || NEAT || — || align=right | 4.2 km || 
|-id=737 bgcolor=#d6d6d6
| 50737 ||  || — || March 6, 2000 || Haleakala || NEAT || — || align=right | 7.1 km || 
|-id=738 bgcolor=#E9E9E9
| 50738 ||  || — || March 9, 2000 || Socorro || LINEAR || — || align=right | 5.0 km || 
|-id=739 bgcolor=#E9E9E9
| 50739 ||  || — || March 11, 2000 || Catalina || CSS || — || align=right | 4.8 km || 
|-id=740 bgcolor=#d6d6d6
| 50740 ||  || — || March 12, 2000 || Anderson Mesa || LONEOS || — || align=right | 9.9 km || 
|-id=741 bgcolor=#fefefe
| 50741 ||  || — || March 12, 2000 || Anderson Mesa || LONEOS || ERI || align=right | 2.6 km || 
|-id=742 bgcolor=#E9E9E9
| 50742 ||  || — || March 12, 2000 || Anderson Mesa || LONEOS || EUN || align=right | 3.7 km || 
|-id=743 bgcolor=#E9E9E9
| 50743 ||  || — || March 3, 2000 || Socorro || LINEAR || HEN || align=right | 2.9 km || 
|-id=744 bgcolor=#E9E9E9
| 50744 ||  || — || March 3, 2000 || Socorro || LINEAR || DOR || align=right | 6.0 km || 
|-id=745 bgcolor=#d6d6d6
| 50745 ||  || — || March 3, 2000 || Socorro || LINEAR || KOR || align=right | 4.2 km || 
|-id=746 bgcolor=#d6d6d6
| 50746 ||  || — || March 5, 2000 || Socorro || LINEAR || EOS || align=right | 7.6 km || 
|-id=747 bgcolor=#d6d6d6
| 50747 ||  || — || March 5, 2000 || Socorro || LINEAR || — || align=right | 8.2 km || 
|-id=748 bgcolor=#E9E9E9
| 50748 ||  || — || March 5, 2000 || Socorro || LINEAR || EUN || align=right | 3.2 km || 
|-id=749 bgcolor=#d6d6d6
| 50749 ||  || — || March 5, 2000 || Socorro || LINEAR || EOS || align=right | 5.8 km || 
|-id=750 bgcolor=#E9E9E9
| 50750 ||  || — || March 5, 2000 || Socorro || LINEAR || — || align=right | 4.3 km || 
|-id=751 bgcolor=#E9E9E9
| 50751 ||  || — || March 4, 2000 || Socorro || LINEAR || — || align=right | 3.3 km || 
|-id=752 bgcolor=#E9E9E9
| 50752 ||  || — || March 4, 2000 || Socorro || LINEAR || — || align=right | 6.0 km || 
|-id=753 bgcolor=#E9E9E9
| 50753 ||  || — || March 3, 2000 || Catalina || CSS || EUN || align=right | 3.5 km || 
|-id=754 bgcolor=#E9E9E9
| 50754 ||  || — || March 4, 2000 || Socorro || LINEAR || MAR || align=right | 3.7 km || 
|-id=755 bgcolor=#fefefe
| 50755 ||  || — || March 4, 2000 || Socorro || LINEAR || — || align=right | 2.4 km || 
|-id=756 bgcolor=#E9E9E9
| 50756 ||  || — || March 4, 2000 || Socorro || LINEAR || — || align=right | 8.2 km || 
|-id=757 bgcolor=#d6d6d6
| 50757 ||  || — || March 5, 2000 || Socorro || LINEAR || — || align=right | 4.1 km || 
|-id=758 bgcolor=#d6d6d6
| 50758 ||  || — || March 5, 2000 || Socorro || LINEAR || TIR || align=right | 10 km || 
|-id=759 bgcolor=#E9E9E9
| 50759 ||  || — || March 5, 2000 || Socorro || LINEAR || — || align=right | 3.5 km || 
|-id=760 bgcolor=#E9E9E9
| 50760 ||  || — || March 5, 2000 || Socorro || LINEAR || MIS || align=right | 5.1 km || 
|-id=761 bgcolor=#E9E9E9
| 50761 ||  || — || March 5, 2000 || Socorro || LINEAR || — || align=right | 8.0 km || 
|-id=762 bgcolor=#E9E9E9
| 50762 ||  || — || March 5, 2000 || Socorro || LINEAR || — || align=right | 5.7 km || 
|-id=763 bgcolor=#E9E9E9
| 50763 ||  || — || March 1, 2000 || Kitt Peak || Spacewatch || — || align=right | 2.3 km || 
|-id=764 bgcolor=#fefefe
| 50764 ||  || — || March 1, 2000 || Kitt Peak || Spacewatch || EUT || align=right | 1.2 km || 
|-id=765 bgcolor=#E9E9E9
| 50765 || 2000 FM || — || March 25, 2000 || Oizumi || T. Kobayashi || — || align=right | 3.5 km || 
|-id=766 bgcolor=#d6d6d6
| 50766 ||  || — || March 25, 2000 || Kitt Peak || Spacewatch || — || align=right | 5.0 km || 
|-id=767 bgcolor=#E9E9E9
| 50767 ||  || — || March 27, 2000 || Farpoint || G. Hug || — || align=right | 5.3 km || 
|-id=768 bgcolor=#E9E9E9
| 50768 Ianwessen ||  ||  || March 27, 2000 || Farpoint || G. Hug || — || align=right | 4.1 km || 
|-id=769 bgcolor=#E9E9E9
| 50769 ||  || — || March 28, 2000 || Socorro || LINEAR || ADE || align=right | 7.7 km || 
|-id=770 bgcolor=#E9E9E9
| 50770 ||  || — || March 29, 2000 || Oizumi || T. Kobayashi || — || align=right | 4.2 km || 
|-id=771 bgcolor=#E9E9E9
| 50771 ||  || — || March 29, 2000 || Oizumi || T. Kobayashi || CLO || align=right | 6.2 km || 
|-id=772 bgcolor=#d6d6d6
| 50772 ||  || — || March 29, 2000 || Kitt Peak || Spacewatch || KOR || align=right | 3.3 km || 
|-id=773 bgcolor=#E9E9E9
| 50773 ||  || — || March 28, 2000 || Socorro || LINEAR || — || align=right | 3.5 km || 
|-id=774 bgcolor=#fefefe
| 50774 ||  || — || March 28, 2000 || Socorro || LINEAR || — || align=right | 2.6 km || 
|-id=775 bgcolor=#d6d6d6
| 50775 ||  || — || March 28, 2000 || Socorro || LINEAR || EOS || align=right | 4.8 km || 
|-id=776 bgcolor=#E9E9E9
| 50776 ||  || — || March 28, 2000 || Socorro || LINEAR || — || align=right | 4.8 km || 
|-id=777 bgcolor=#E9E9E9
| 50777 ||  || — || March 29, 2000 || Socorro || LINEAR || MAR || align=right | 4.1 km || 
|-id=778 bgcolor=#E9E9E9
| 50778 ||  || — || March 28, 2000 || Socorro || LINEAR || — || align=right | 2.5 km || 
|-id=779 bgcolor=#E9E9E9
| 50779 ||  || — || March 28, 2000 || Socorro || LINEAR || PAD || align=right | 5.7 km || 
|-id=780 bgcolor=#d6d6d6
| 50780 ||  || — || March 28, 2000 || Socorro || LINEAR || EOS || align=right | 5.7 km || 
|-id=781 bgcolor=#E9E9E9
| 50781 ||  || — || March 28, 2000 || Socorro || LINEAR || — || align=right | 5.9 km || 
|-id=782 bgcolor=#fefefe
| 50782 ||  || — || March 28, 2000 || Socorro || LINEAR || — || align=right | 2.6 km || 
|-id=783 bgcolor=#E9E9E9
| 50783 ||  || — || March 28, 2000 || Socorro || LINEAR || — || align=right | 4.5 km || 
|-id=784 bgcolor=#d6d6d6
| 50784 ||  || — || March 28, 2000 || Socorro || LINEAR || — || align=right | 8.4 km || 
|-id=785 bgcolor=#E9E9E9
| 50785 ||  || — || March 29, 2000 || Socorro || LINEAR || ADE || align=right | 7.2 km || 
|-id=786 bgcolor=#d6d6d6
| 50786 ||  || — || March 29, 2000 || Socorro || LINEAR || — || align=right | 7.3 km || 
|-id=787 bgcolor=#fefefe
| 50787 ||  || — || March 29, 2000 || Socorro || LINEAR || — || align=right | 2.6 km || 
|-id=788 bgcolor=#E9E9E9
| 50788 ||  || — || March 29, 2000 || Socorro || LINEAR || — || align=right | 7.3 km || 
|-id=789 bgcolor=#E9E9E9
| 50789 ||  || — || March 29, 2000 || Socorro || LINEAR || — || align=right | 4.5 km || 
|-id=790 bgcolor=#d6d6d6
| 50790 ||  || — || March 29, 2000 || Socorro || LINEAR || EOS || align=right | 6.1 km || 
|-id=791 bgcolor=#E9E9E9
| 50791 ||  || — || March 29, 2000 || Socorro || LINEAR || ADE || align=right | 6.5 km || 
|-id=792 bgcolor=#E9E9E9
| 50792 ||  || — || March 29, 2000 || Socorro || LINEAR || — || align=right | 3.5 km || 
|-id=793 bgcolor=#E9E9E9
| 50793 ||  || — || March 29, 2000 || Socorro || LINEAR || GEF || align=right | 3.8 km || 
|-id=794 bgcolor=#E9E9E9
| 50794 ||  || — || March 29, 2000 || Socorro || LINEAR || — || align=right | 4.0 km || 
|-id=795 bgcolor=#E9E9E9
| 50795 ||  || — || March 29, 2000 || Socorro || LINEAR || EUN || align=right | 4.5 km || 
|-id=796 bgcolor=#d6d6d6
| 50796 ||  || — || March 27, 2000 || Anderson Mesa || LONEOS || — || align=right | 9.3 km || 
|-id=797 bgcolor=#d6d6d6
| 50797 ||  || — || March 27, 2000 || Anderson Mesa || LONEOS || KOR || align=right | 3.8 km || 
|-id=798 bgcolor=#d6d6d6
| 50798 ||  || — || March 27, 2000 || Anderson Mesa || LONEOS || — || align=right | 5.2 km || 
|-id=799 bgcolor=#E9E9E9
| 50799 ||  || — || March 27, 2000 || Anderson Mesa || LONEOS || — || align=right | 6.4 km || 
|-id=800 bgcolor=#d6d6d6
| 50800 ||  || — || March 27, 2000 || Anderson Mesa || LONEOS || — || align=right | 5.1 km || 
|}

50801–50900 

|-bgcolor=#d6d6d6
| 50801 ||  || — || March 27, 2000 || Anderson Mesa || LONEOS || EOS || align=right | 4.6 km || 
|-id=802 bgcolor=#d6d6d6
| 50802 ||  || — || March 27, 2000 || Anderson Mesa || LONEOS || — || align=right | 3.9 km || 
|-id=803 bgcolor=#E9E9E9
| 50803 ||  || — || March 27, 2000 || Anderson Mesa || LONEOS || EUN || align=right | 3.1 km || 
|-id=804 bgcolor=#E9E9E9
| 50804 ||  || — || March 27, 2000 || Anderson Mesa || LONEOS || — || align=right | 3.7 km || 
|-id=805 bgcolor=#d6d6d6
| 50805 ||  || — || March 27, 2000 || Anderson Mesa || LONEOS || — || align=right | 6.2 km || 
|-id=806 bgcolor=#d6d6d6
| 50806 ||  || — || March 27, 2000 || Anderson Mesa || LONEOS || SAN || align=right | 6.3 km || 
|-id=807 bgcolor=#d6d6d6
| 50807 ||  || — || March 27, 2000 || Anderson Mesa || LONEOS || HYG || align=right | 7.8 km || 
|-id=808 bgcolor=#fefefe
| 50808 ||  || — || March 27, 2000 || Anderson Mesa || LONEOS || — || align=right | 2.7 km || 
|-id=809 bgcolor=#d6d6d6
| 50809 ||  || — || March 27, 2000 || Anderson Mesa || LONEOS || — || align=right | 8.7 km || 
|-id=810 bgcolor=#E9E9E9
| 50810 ||  || — || March 27, 2000 || Anderson Mesa || LONEOS || — || align=right | 8.2 km || 
|-id=811 bgcolor=#d6d6d6
| 50811 ||  || — || March 27, 2000 || Anderson Mesa || LONEOS || KOR || align=right | 3.6 km || 
|-id=812 bgcolor=#fefefe
| 50812 ||  || — || March 27, 2000 || Anderson Mesa || LONEOS || — || align=right | 3.3 km || 
|-id=813 bgcolor=#E9E9E9
| 50813 ||  || — || March 27, 2000 || Anderson Mesa || LONEOS || — || align=right | 3.4 km || 
|-id=814 bgcolor=#E9E9E9
| 50814 ||  || — || March 27, 2000 || Anderson Mesa || LONEOS || — || align=right | 3.7 km || 
|-id=815 bgcolor=#E9E9E9
| 50815 ||  || — || March 28, 2000 || Socorro || LINEAR || — || align=right | 2.9 km || 
|-id=816 bgcolor=#E9E9E9
| 50816 ||  || — || March 29, 2000 || Socorro || LINEAR || EUN || align=right | 4.3 km || 
|-id=817 bgcolor=#E9E9E9
| 50817 ||  || — || March 29, 2000 || Socorro || LINEAR || — || align=right | 4.5 km || 
|-id=818 bgcolor=#fefefe
| 50818 ||  || — || March 29, 2000 || Socorro || LINEAR || V || align=right | 2.1 km || 
|-id=819 bgcolor=#E9E9E9
| 50819 ||  || — || March 29, 2000 || Socorro || LINEAR || — || align=right | 2.8 km || 
|-id=820 bgcolor=#d6d6d6
| 50820 ||  || — || March 29, 2000 || Socorro || LINEAR || — || align=right | 4.1 km || 
|-id=821 bgcolor=#E9E9E9
| 50821 ||  || — || March 29, 2000 || Socorro || LINEAR || — || align=right | 3.6 km || 
|-id=822 bgcolor=#E9E9E9
| 50822 ||  || — || March 29, 2000 || Socorro || LINEAR || — || align=right | 6.7 km || 
|-id=823 bgcolor=#d6d6d6
| 50823 ||  || — || March 29, 2000 || Socorro || LINEAR || HYG || align=right | 7.0 km || 
|-id=824 bgcolor=#E9E9E9
| 50824 ||  || — || March 29, 2000 || Socorro || LINEAR || PAD || align=right | 5.7 km || 
|-id=825 bgcolor=#E9E9E9
| 50825 ||  || — || March 29, 2000 || Socorro || LINEAR || — || align=right | 7.2 km || 
|-id=826 bgcolor=#E9E9E9
| 50826 ||  || — || March 29, 2000 || Socorro || LINEAR || — || align=right | 5.6 km || 
|-id=827 bgcolor=#d6d6d6
| 50827 ||  || — || March 29, 2000 || Socorro || LINEAR || EOS || align=right | 5.4 km || 
|-id=828 bgcolor=#E9E9E9
| 50828 ||  || — || March 29, 2000 || Socorro || LINEAR || — || align=right | 2.6 km || 
|-id=829 bgcolor=#E9E9E9
| 50829 ||  || — || March 29, 2000 || Socorro || LINEAR || — || align=right | 4.7 km || 
|-id=830 bgcolor=#E9E9E9
| 50830 ||  || — || March 29, 2000 || Socorro || LINEAR || — || align=right | 5.9 km || 
|-id=831 bgcolor=#E9E9E9
| 50831 ||  || — || March 29, 2000 || Socorro || LINEAR || — || align=right | 5.2 km || 
|-id=832 bgcolor=#d6d6d6
| 50832 ||  || — || March 29, 2000 || Socorro || LINEAR || KOR || align=right | 4.3 km || 
|-id=833 bgcolor=#E9E9E9
| 50833 ||  || — || March 29, 2000 || Socorro || LINEAR || WIT || align=right | 2.9 km || 
|-id=834 bgcolor=#d6d6d6
| 50834 ||  || — || March 29, 2000 || Socorro || LINEAR || — || align=right | 5.1 km || 
|-id=835 bgcolor=#E9E9E9
| 50835 ||  || — || March 29, 2000 || Socorro || LINEAR || EUN || align=right | 4.8 km || 
|-id=836 bgcolor=#E9E9E9
| 50836 ||  || — || March 29, 2000 || Socorro || LINEAR || HOF || align=right | 6.6 km || 
|-id=837 bgcolor=#d6d6d6
| 50837 ||  || — || March 29, 2000 || Socorro || LINEAR || — || align=right | 5.3 km || 
|-id=838 bgcolor=#E9E9E9
| 50838 ||  || — || March 28, 2000 || Socorro || LINEAR || — || align=right | 3.1 km || 
|-id=839 bgcolor=#d6d6d6
| 50839 ||  || — || March 29, 2000 || Socorro || LINEAR || NAE || align=right | 7.7 km || 
|-id=840 bgcolor=#d6d6d6
| 50840 ||  || — || March 29, 2000 || Socorro || LINEAR || — || align=right | 5.4 km || 
|-id=841 bgcolor=#E9E9E9
| 50841 ||  || — || March 29, 2000 || Socorro || LINEAR || — || align=right | 3.8 km || 
|-id=842 bgcolor=#E9E9E9
| 50842 ||  || — || March 29, 2000 || Socorro || LINEAR || EUN || align=right | 2.6 km || 
|-id=843 bgcolor=#E9E9E9
| 50843 ||  || — || March 29, 2000 || Socorro || LINEAR || — || align=right | 4.4 km || 
|-id=844 bgcolor=#d6d6d6
| 50844 ||  || — || March 29, 2000 || Socorro || LINEAR || — || align=right | 5.5 km || 
|-id=845 bgcolor=#d6d6d6
| 50845 ||  || — || March 29, 2000 || Socorro || LINEAR || — || align=right | 7.9 km || 
|-id=846 bgcolor=#E9E9E9
| 50846 ||  || — || March 29, 2000 || Socorro || LINEAR || — || align=right | 2.5 km || 
|-id=847 bgcolor=#d6d6d6
| 50847 ||  || — || March 29, 2000 || Socorro || LINEAR || EMA || align=right | 13 km || 
|-id=848 bgcolor=#E9E9E9
| 50848 ||  || — || March 29, 2000 || Socorro || LINEAR || — || align=right | 6.5 km || 
|-id=849 bgcolor=#E9E9E9
| 50849 ||  || — || March 29, 2000 || Socorro || LINEAR || — || align=right | 3.5 km || 
|-id=850 bgcolor=#d6d6d6
| 50850 ||  || — || March 29, 2000 || Socorro || LINEAR || — || align=right | 6.6 km || 
|-id=851 bgcolor=#fefefe
| 50851 ||  || — || March 29, 2000 || Socorro || LINEAR || — || align=right | 2.9 km || 
|-id=852 bgcolor=#d6d6d6
| 50852 ||  || — || March 29, 2000 || Socorro || LINEAR || — || align=right | 4.6 km || 
|-id=853 bgcolor=#E9E9E9
| 50853 ||  || — || March 31, 2000 || Socorro || LINEAR || EUN || align=right | 3.5 km || 
|-id=854 bgcolor=#E9E9E9
| 50854 ||  || — || March 31, 2000 || Socorro || LINEAR || EUN || align=right | 4.2 km || 
|-id=855 bgcolor=#E9E9E9
| 50855 Williamschultz ||  ||  || March 30, 2000 || Catalina || CSS || — || align=right | 3.3 km || 
|-id=856 bgcolor=#E9E9E9
| 50856 ||  || — || March 26, 2000 || Anderson Mesa || LONEOS || — || align=right | 7.7 km || 
|-id=857 bgcolor=#d6d6d6
| 50857 ||  || — || March 26, 2000 || Anderson Mesa || LONEOS || KOR || align=right | 4.0 km || 
|-id=858 bgcolor=#E9E9E9
| 50858 ||  || — || March 29, 2000 || Socorro || LINEAR || — || align=right | 5.4 km || 
|-id=859 bgcolor=#d6d6d6
| 50859 ||  || — || March 30, 2000 || Socorro || LINEAR || VER || align=right | 9.0 km || 
|-id=860 bgcolor=#E9E9E9
| 50860 ||  || — || March 26, 2000 || Anderson Mesa || LONEOS || EUN || align=right | 4.2 km || 
|-id=861 bgcolor=#E9E9E9
| 50861 ||  || — || March 27, 2000 || Anderson Mesa || LONEOS || — || align=right | 6.0 km || 
|-id=862 bgcolor=#E9E9E9
| 50862 ||  || — || March 26, 2000 || Anderson Mesa || LONEOS || BRU || align=right | 13 km || 
|-id=863 bgcolor=#E9E9E9
| 50863 ||  || — || April 4, 2000 || Prescott || P. G. Comba || MAR || align=right | 3.9 km || 
|-id=864 bgcolor=#d6d6d6
| 50864 ||  || — || April 5, 2000 || High Point || D. K. Chesney || EOS || align=right | 8.5 km || 
|-id=865 bgcolor=#fefefe
| 50865 ||  || — || April 3, 2000 || Socorro || LINEAR || — || align=right | 3.2 km || 
|-id=866 bgcolor=#E9E9E9
| 50866 Davidesprizzi ||  ||  || April 1, 2000 || Colleverde || V. S. Casulli || EUNfast? || align=right | 6.3 km || 
|-id=867 bgcolor=#FA8072
| 50867 ||  || — || April 4, 2000 || Socorro || LINEAR || PHO || align=right | 2.7 km || 
|-id=868 bgcolor=#d6d6d6
| 50868 ||  || — || April 4, 2000 || Socorro || LINEAR || — || align=right | 5.3 km || 
|-id=869 bgcolor=#fefefe
| 50869 ||  || — || April 5, 2000 || Socorro || LINEAR || MAS || align=right | 1.6 km || 
|-id=870 bgcolor=#fefefe
| 50870 ||  || — || April 5, 2000 || Socorro || LINEAR || NYS || align=right | 1.8 km || 
|-id=871 bgcolor=#d6d6d6
| 50871 ||  || — || April 5, 2000 || Socorro || LINEAR || KOR || align=right | 3.9 km || 
|-id=872 bgcolor=#fefefe
| 50872 ||  || — || April 5, 2000 || Socorro || LINEAR || NYS || align=right | 7.3 km || 
|-id=873 bgcolor=#E9E9E9
| 50873 ||  || — || April 5, 2000 || Socorro || LINEAR || — || align=right | 2.6 km || 
|-id=874 bgcolor=#E9E9E9
| 50874 ||  || — || April 5, 2000 || Socorro || LINEAR || — || align=right | 4.1 km || 
|-id=875 bgcolor=#E9E9E9
| 50875 ||  || — || April 5, 2000 || Socorro || LINEAR || HEN || align=right | 2.8 km || 
|-id=876 bgcolor=#E9E9E9
| 50876 ||  || — || April 5, 2000 || Socorro || LINEAR || — || align=right | 2.9 km || 
|-id=877 bgcolor=#d6d6d6
| 50877 ||  || — || April 5, 2000 || Socorro || LINEAR || — || align=right | 3.9 km || 
|-id=878 bgcolor=#d6d6d6
| 50878 ||  || — || April 5, 2000 || Socorro || LINEAR || — || align=right | 3.8 km || 
|-id=879 bgcolor=#E9E9E9
| 50879 ||  || — || April 5, 2000 || Socorro || LINEAR || AGN || align=right | 4.1 km || 
|-id=880 bgcolor=#d6d6d6
| 50880 ||  || — || April 5, 2000 || Socorro || LINEAR || — || align=right | 6.4 km || 
|-id=881 bgcolor=#E9E9E9
| 50881 ||  || — || April 5, 2000 || Socorro || LINEAR || — || align=right | 3.5 km || 
|-id=882 bgcolor=#E9E9E9
| 50882 ||  || — || April 5, 2000 || Socorro || LINEAR || — || align=right | 5.7 km || 
|-id=883 bgcolor=#E9E9E9
| 50883 ||  || — || April 5, 2000 || Socorro || LINEAR || — || align=right | 3.2 km || 
|-id=884 bgcolor=#d6d6d6
| 50884 ||  || — || April 5, 2000 || Socorro || LINEAR || EOS || align=right | 4.4 km || 
|-id=885 bgcolor=#E9E9E9
| 50885 ||  || — || April 5, 2000 || Socorro || LINEAR || — || align=right | 2.1 km || 
|-id=886 bgcolor=#d6d6d6
| 50886 ||  || — || April 5, 2000 || Socorro || LINEAR || — || align=right | 6.4 km || 
|-id=887 bgcolor=#E9E9E9
| 50887 ||  || — || April 5, 2000 || Socorro || LINEAR || HNS || align=right | 3.9 km || 
|-id=888 bgcolor=#fefefe
| 50888 ||  || — || April 5, 2000 || Socorro || LINEAR || NYS || align=right | 2.1 km || 
|-id=889 bgcolor=#d6d6d6
| 50889 ||  || — || April 5, 2000 || Socorro || LINEAR || KOR || align=right | 3.8 km || 
|-id=890 bgcolor=#E9E9E9
| 50890 ||  || — || April 5, 2000 || Socorro || LINEAR || — || align=right | 4.0 km || 
|-id=891 bgcolor=#d6d6d6
| 50891 ||  || — || April 5, 2000 || Socorro || LINEAR || — || align=right | 3.7 km || 
|-id=892 bgcolor=#d6d6d6
| 50892 ||  || — || April 5, 2000 || Socorro || LINEAR || — || align=right | 5.9 km || 
|-id=893 bgcolor=#d6d6d6
| 50893 ||  || — || April 5, 2000 || Socorro || LINEAR || EOS || align=right | 4.4 km || 
|-id=894 bgcolor=#d6d6d6
| 50894 ||  || — || April 5, 2000 || Socorro || LINEAR || KOR || align=right | 4.2 km || 
|-id=895 bgcolor=#E9E9E9
| 50895 ||  || — || April 5, 2000 || Socorro || LINEAR || — || align=right | 4.2 km || 
|-id=896 bgcolor=#d6d6d6
| 50896 ||  || — || April 5, 2000 || Socorro || LINEAR || KOR || align=right | 3.5 km || 
|-id=897 bgcolor=#E9E9E9
| 50897 ||  || — || April 5, 2000 || Socorro || LINEAR || — || align=right | 8.0 km || 
|-id=898 bgcolor=#d6d6d6
| 50898 ||  || — || April 5, 2000 || Socorro || LINEAR || KOR || align=right | 4.0 km || 
|-id=899 bgcolor=#E9E9E9
| 50899 ||  || — || April 5, 2000 || Socorro || LINEAR || HEN || align=right | 3.9 km || 
|-id=900 bgcolor=#d6d6d6
| 50900 ||  || — || April 5, 2000 || Socorro || LINEAR || — || align=right | 3.5 km || 
|}

50901–51000 

|-bgcolor=#d6d6d6
| 50901 ||  || — || April 5, 2000 || Socorro || LINEAR || — || align=right | 4.1 km || 
|-id=902 bgcolor=#d6d6d6
| 50902 ||  || — || April 5, 2000 || Socorro || LINEAR || — || align=right | 6.6 km || 
|-id=903 bgcolor=#E9E9E9
| 50903 ||  || — || April 5, 2000 || Socorro || LINEAR || — || align=right | 5.6 km || 
|-id=904 bgcolor=#d6d6d6
| 50904 ||  || — || April 5, 2000 || Socorro || LINEAR || THM || align=right | 6.3 km || 
|-id=905 bgcolor=#d6d6d6
| 50905 ||  || — || April 5, 2000 || Socorro || LINEAR || — || align=right | 5.8 km || 
|-id=906 bgcolor=#d6d6d6
| 50906 ||  || — || April 5, 2000 || Socorro || LINEAR || — || align=right | 7.3 km || 
|-id=907 bgcolor=#fefefe
| 50907 ||  || — || April 5, 2000 || Socorro || LINEAR || ERI || align=right | 5.3 km || 
|-id=908 bgcolor=#E9E9E9
| 50908 ||  || — || April 5, 2000 || Socorro || LINEAR || — || align=right | 3.7 km || 
|-id=909 bgcolor=#d6d6d6
| 50909 ||  || — || April 5, 2000 || Socorro || LINEAR || — || align=right | 3.8 km || 
|-id=910 bgcolor=#E9E9E9
| 50910 ||  || — || April 5, 2000 || Socorro || LINEAR || — || align=right | 3.1 km || 
|-id=911 bgcolor=#E9E9E9
| 50911 ||  || — || April 5, 2000 || Socorro || LINEAR || — || align=right | 2.4 km || 
|-id=912 bgcolor=#E9E9E9
| 50912 ||  || — || April 5, 2000 || Socorro || LINEAR || MRX || align=right | 3.1 km || 
|-id=913 bgcolor=#E9E9E9
| 50913 ||  || — || April 5, 2000 || Socorro || LINEAR || — || align=right | 5.3 km || 
|-id=914 bgcolor=#d6d6d6
| 50914 ||  || — || April 5, 2000 || Socorro || LINEAR || — || align=right | 9.2 km || 
|-id=915 bgcolor=#d6d6d6
| 50915 ||  || — || April 5, 2000 || Socorro || LINEAR || KOR || align=right | 5.5 km || 
|-id=916 bgcolor=#d6d6d6
| 50916 ||  || — || April 5, 2000 || Socorro || LINEAR || — || align=right | 6.0 km || 
|-id=917 bgcolor=#E9E9E9
| 50917 ||  || — || April 5, 2000 || Socorro || LINEAR || — || align=right | 4.4 km || 
|-id=918 bgcolor=#d6d6d6
| 50918 ||  || — || April 5, 2000 || Socorro || LINEAR || — || align=right | 5.9 km || 
|-id=919 bgcolor=#d6d6d6
| 50919 ||  || — || April 5, 2000 || Socorro || LINEAR || EOS || align=right | 5.8 km || 
|-id=920 bgcolor=#d6d6d6
| 50920 ||  || — || April 5, 2000 || Socorro || LINEAR || — || align=right | 4.3 km || 
|-id=921 bgcolor=#E9E9E9
| 50921 ||  || — || April 5, 2000 || Socorro || LINEAR || — || align=right | 5.0 km || 
|-id=922 bgcolor=#d6d6d6
| 50922 ||  || — || April 5, 2000 || Socorro || LINEAR || — || align=right | 5.2 km || 
|-id=923 bgcolor=#E9E9E9
| 50923 ||  || — || April 5, 2000 || Socorro || LINEAR || — || align=right | 3.8 km || 
|-id=924 bgcolor=#d6d6d6
| 50924 ||  || — || April 5, 2000 || Socorro || LINEAR || KOR || align=right | 4.9 km || 
|-id=925 bgcolor=#E9E9E9
| 50925 ||  || — || April 5, 2000 || Socorro || LINEAR || EUN || align=right | 5.2 km || 
|-id=926 bgcolor=#E9E9E9
| 50926 ||  || — || April 5, 2000 || Socorro || LINEAR || — || align=right | 4.6 km || 
|-id=927 bgcolor=#E9E9E9
| 50927 ||  || — || April 5, 2000 || Socorro || LINEAR || — || align=right | 8.8 km || 
|-id=928 bgcolor=#E9E9E9
| 50928 ||  || — || April 5, 2000 || Socorro || LINEAR || — || align=right | 5.6 km || 
|-id=929 bgcolor=#E9E9E9
| 50929 ||  || — || April 5, 2000 || Socorro || LINEAR || — || align=right | 4.8 km || 
|-id=930 bgcolor=#d6d6d6
| 50930 ||  || — || April 5, 2000 || Socorro || LINEAR || EOS || align=right | 3.9 km || 
|-id=931 bgcolor=#d6d6d6
| 50931 ||  || — || April 5, 2000 || Socorro || LINEAR || — || align=right | 8.4 km || 
|-id=932 bgcolor=#E9E9E9
| 50932 ||  || — || April 5, 2000 || Socorro || LINEAR || EUN || align=right | 4.3 km || 
|-id=933 bgcolor=#d6d6d6
| 50933 ||  || — || April 5, 2000 || Socorro || LINEAR || MEL || align=right | 12 km || 
|-id=934 bgcolor=#E9E9E9
| 50934 ||  || — || April 5, 2000 || Socorro || LINEAR || PAD || align=right | 5.1 km || 
|-id=935 bgcolor=#d6d6d6
| 50935 ||  || — || April 5, 2000 || Socorro || LINEAR || THM || align=right | 5.8 km || 
|-id=936 bgcolor=#d6d6d6
| 50936 ||  || — || April 5, 2000 || Socorro || LINEAR || — || align=right | 5.0 km || 
|-id=937 bgcolor=#d6d6d6
| 50937 ||  || — || April 5, 2000 || Socorro || LINEAR || — || align=right | 6.8 km || 
|-id=938 bgcolor=#E9E9E9
| 50938 ||  || — || April 5, 2000 || Socorro || LINEAR || — || align=right | 6.6 km || 
|-id=939 bgcolor=#E9E9E9
| 50939 ||  || — || April 5, 2000 || Socorro || LINEAR || — || align=right | 7.3 km || 
|-id=940 bgcolor=#d6d6d6
| 50940 ||  || — || April 5, 2000 || Socorro || LINEAR || — || align=right | 10 km || 
|-id=941 bgcolor=#E9E9E9
| 50941 ||  || — || April 5, 2000 || Socorro || LINEAR || — || align=right | 4.9 km || 
|-id=942 bgcolor=#d6d6d6
| 50942 ||  || — || April 5, 2000 || Socorro || LINEAR || 7:4 || align=right | 10 km || 
|-id=943 bgcolor=#E9E9E9
| 50943 ||  || — || April 5, 2000 || Socorro || LINEAR || — || align=right | 6.0 km || 
|-id=944 bgcolor=#E9E9E9
| 50944 ||  || — || April 5, 2000 || Socorro || LINEAR || — || align=right | 4.8 km || 
|-id=945 bgcolor=#d6d6d6
| 50945 ||  || — || April 5, 2000 || Socorro || LINEAR || — || align=right | 5.2 km || 
|-id=946 bgcolor=#d6d6d6
| 50946 ||  || — || April 5, 2000 || Socorro || LINEAR || EOS || align=right | 4.5 km || 
|-id=947 bgcolor=#d6d6d6
| 50947 ||  || — || April 5, 2000 || Socorro || LINEAR || — || align=right | 9.1 km || 
|-id=948 bgcolor=#E9E9E9
| 50948 ||  || — || April 5, 2000 || Socorro || LINEAR || EUN || align=right | 2.7 km || 
|-id=949 bgcolor=#d6d6d6
| 50949 ||  || — || April 5, 2000 || Socorro || LINEAR || — || align=right | 4.4 km || 
|-id=950 bgcolor=#d6d6d6
| 50950 ||  || — || April 5, 2000 || Socorro || LINEAR || — || align=right | 4.3 km || 
|-id=951 bgcolor=#d6d6d6
| 50951 ||  || — || April 5, 2000 || Socorro || LINEAR || EOS || align=right | 4.9 km || 
|-id=952 bgcolor=#d6d6d6
| 50952 ||  || — || April 5, 2000 || Socorro || LINEAR || EOS || align=right | 4.5 km || 
|-id=953 bgcolor=#d6d6d6
| 50953 ||  || — || April 5, 2000 || Socorro || LINEAR || THM || align=right | 7.3 km || 
|-id=954 bgcolor=#E9E9E9
| 50954 ||  || — || April 5, 2000 || Socorro || LINEAR || — || align=right | 6.4 km || 
|-id=955 bgcolor=#E9E9E9
| 50955 ||  || — || April 5, 2000 || Socorro || LINEAR || — || align=right | 3.4 km || 
|-id=956 bgcolor=#E9E9E9
| 50956 ||  || — || April 6, 2000 || Socorro || LINEAR || — || align=right | 5.1 km || 
|-id=957 bgcolor=#E9E9E9
| 50957 ||  || — || April 6, 2000 || Socorro || LINEAR || CLO || align=right | 7.5 km || 
|-id=958 bgcolor=#E9E9E9
| 50958 ||  || — || April 6, 2000 || Socorro || LINEAR || — || align=right | 5.8 km || 
|-id=959 bgcolor=#d6d6d6
| 50959 ||  || — || April 6, 2000 || Socorro || LINEAR || THM || align=right | 8.5 km || 
|-id=960 bgcolor=#d6d6d6
| 50960 ||  || — || April 9, 2000 || Kleť || Kleť Obs. || EOS || align=right | 6.2 km || 
|-id=961 bgcolor=#E9E9E9
| 50961 ||  || — || April 2, 2000 || Socorro || LINEAR || — || align=right | 3.2 km || 
|-id=962 bgcolor=#fefefe
| 50962 ||  || — || April 3, 2000 || Socorro || LINEAR || — || align=right | 2.2 km || 
|-id=963 bgcolor=#d6d6d6
| 50963 ||  || — || April 3, 2000 || Socorro || LINEAR || AEG || align=right | 8.3 km || 
|-id=964 bgcolor=#E9E9E9
| 50964 ||  || — || April 3, 2000 || Socorro || LINEAR || EUN || align=right | 4.5 km || 
|-id=965 bgcolor=#d6d6d6
| 50965 ||  || — || April 3, 2000 || Socorro || LINEAR || — || align=right | 11 km || 
|-id=966 bgcolor=#d6d6d6
| 50966 ||  || — || April 4, 2000 || Socorro || LINEAR || — || align=right | 4.9 km || 
|-id=967 bgcolor=#E9E9E9
| 50967 ||  || — || April 4, 2000 || Socorro || LINEAR || — || align=right | 3.9 km || 
|-id=968 bgcolor=#E9E9E9
| 50968 ||  || — || April 4, 2000 || Socorro || LINEAR || — || align=right | 3.5 km || 
|-id=969 bgcolor=#fefefe
| 50969 ||  || — || April 4, 2000 || Socorro || LINEAR || V || align=right | 2.8 km || 
|-id=970 bgcolor=#fefefe
| 50970 ||  || — || April 4, 2000 || Socorro || LINEAR || FLO || align=right | 2.3 km || 
|-id=971 bgcolor=#d6d6d6
| 50971 ||  || — || April 4, 2000 || Socorro || LINEAR || EOS || align=right | 6.6 km || 
|-id=972 bgcolor=#d6d6d6
| 50972 ||  || — || April 4, 2000 || Socorro || LINEAR || — || align=right | 6.9 km || 
|-id=973 bgcolor=#d6d6d6
| 50973 ||  || — || April 4, 2000 || Socorro || LINEAR || EOS || align=right | 5.2 km || 
|-id=974 bgcolor=#d6d6d6
| 50974 ||  || — || April 4, 2000 || Socorro || LINEAR || EOS || align=right | 4.2 km || 
|-id=975 bgcolor=#d6d6d6
| 50975 ||  || — || April 4, 2000 || Socorro || LINEAR || EOS || align=right | 5.2 km || 
|-id=976 bgcolor=#d6d6d6
| 50976 ||  || — || April 4, 2000 || Socorro || LINEAR || LUT || align=right | 13 km || 
|-id=977 bgcolor=#E9E9E9
| 50977 ||  || — || April 5, 2000 || Socorro || LINEAR || — || align=right | 3.7 km || 
|-id=978 bgcolor=#E9E9E9
| 50978 ||  || — || April 5, 2000 || Socorro || LINEAR || — || align=right | 3.9 km || 
|-id=979 bgcolor=#d6d6d6
| 50979 ||  || — || April 5, 2000 || Socorro || LINEAR || EOS || align=right | 6.3 km || 
|-id=980 bgcolor=#d6d6d6
| 50980 ||  || — || April 5, 2000 || Socorro || LINEAR || — || align=right | 9.2 km || 
|-id=981 bgcolor=#d6d6d6
| 50981 ||  || — || April 5, 2000 || Socorro || LINEAR || EOS || align=right | 6.1 km || 
|-id=982 bgcolor=#d6d6d6
| 50982 ||  || — || April 5, 2000 || Socorro || LINEAR || — || align=right | 11 km || 
|-id=983 bgcolor=#d6d6d6
| 50983 ||  || — || April 5, 2000 || Socorro || LINEAR || EOS || align=right | 8.0 km || 
|-id=984 bgcolor=#d6d6d6
| 50984 ||  || — || April 5, 2000 || Socorro || LINEAR || — || align=right | 4.9 km || 
|-id=985 bgcolor=#d6d6d6
| 50985 ||  || — || April 5, 2000 || Socorro || LINEAR || — || align=right | 5.7 km || 
|-id=986 bgcolor=#E9E9E9
| 50986 ||  || — || April 5, 2000 || Socorro || LINEAR || — || align=right | 5.9 km || 
|-id=987 bgcolor=#d6d6d6
| 50987 ||  || — || April 5, 2000 || Socorro || LINEAR || EOS || align=right | 6.4 km || 
|-id=988 bgcolor=#d6d6d6
| 50988 ||  || — || April 5, 2000 || Socorro || LINEAR || EOS || align=right | 4.7 km || 
|-id=989 bgcolor=#d6d6d6
| 50989 ||  || — || April 5, 2000 || Socorro || LINEAR || EOS || align=right | 5.0 km || 
|-id=990 bgcolor=#d6d6d6
| 50990 ||  || — || April 5, 2000 || Socorro || LINEAR || — || align=right | 5.0 km || 
|-id=991 bgcolor=#E9E9E9
| 50991 ||  || — || April 5, 2000 || Socorro || LINEAR || — || align=right | 3.6 km || 
|-id=992 bgcolor=#E9E9E9
| 50992 ||  || — || April 5, 2000 || Socorro || LINEAR || — || align=right | 4.3 km || 
|-id=993 bgcolor=#E9E9E9
| 50993 ||  || — || April 5, 2000 || Socorro || LINEAR || — || align=right | 4.4 km || 
|-id=994 bgcolor=#d6d6d6
| 50994 ||  || — || April 5, 2000 || Socorro || LINEAR || — || align=right | 8.4 km || 
|-id=995 bgcolor=#fefefe
| 50995 ||  || — || April 6, 2000 || Socorro || LINEAR || — || align=right | 4.5 km || 
|-id=996 bgcolor=#d6d6d6
| 50996 ||  || — || April 6, 2000 || Socorro || LINEAR || HYG || align=right | 8.1 km || 
|-id=997 bgcolor=#E9E9E9
| 50997 ||  || — || April 7, 2000 || Socorro || LINEAR || — || align=right | 3.8 km || 
|-id=998 bgcolor=#d6d6d6
| 50998 ||  || — || April 7, 2000 || Socorro || LINEAR || EOS || align=right | 5.6 km || 
|-id=999 bgcolor=#d6d6d6
| 50999 ||  || — || April 7, 2000 || Socorro || LINEAR || HYG || align=right | 6.3 km || 
|-id=000 bgcolor=#E9E9E9
| 51000 ||  || — || April 7, 2000 || Socorro || LINEAR || ADE || align=right | 5.8 km || 
|}

References

External links 
 Discovery Circumstances: Numbered Minor Planets (50001)–(55000) (IAU Minor Planet Center)

0050